= Dix Mountain Wilderness Area =

Wilderness area in New York, United States

- IUCN category Ib (wilderness area)
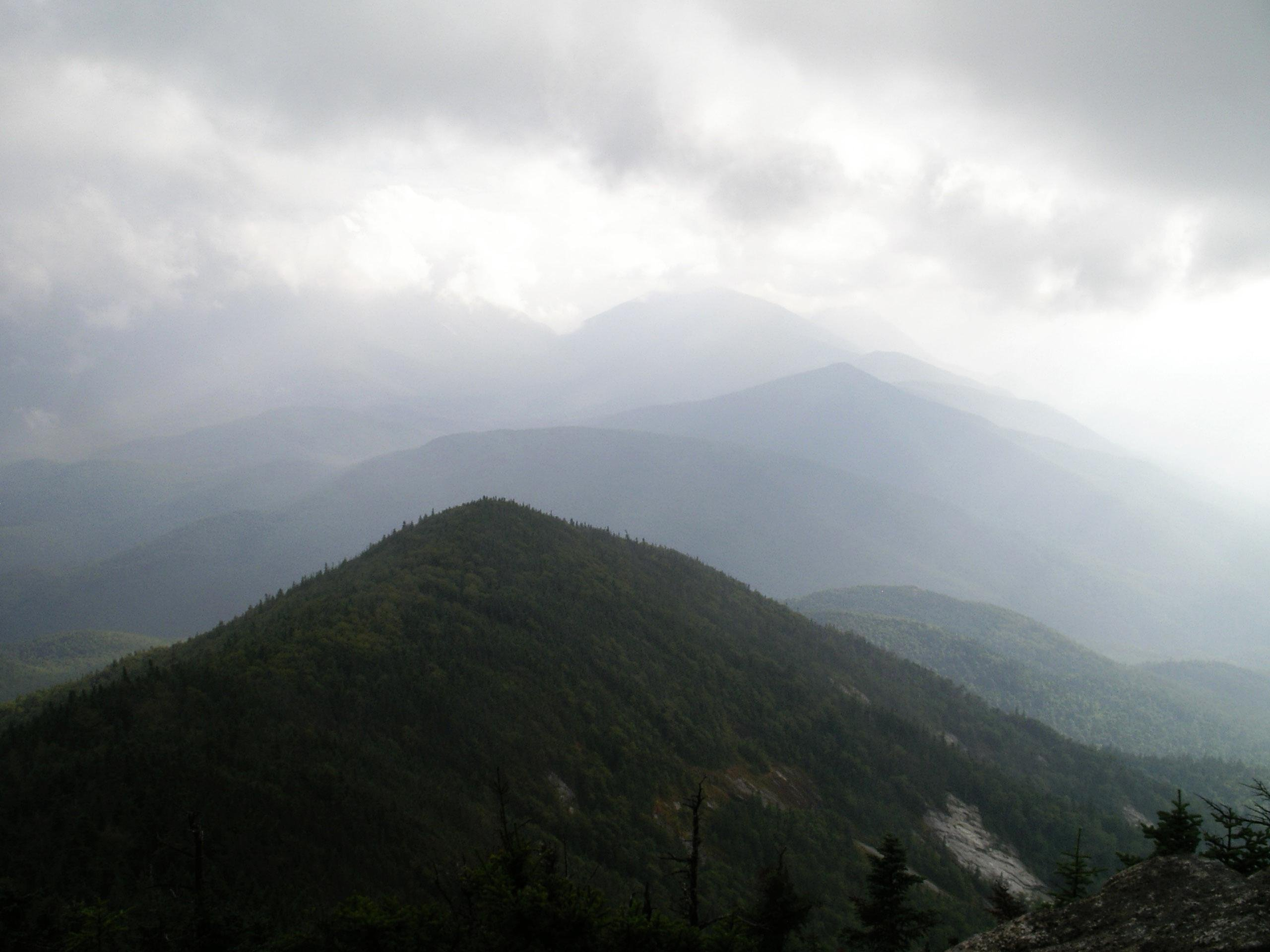
- View of Dix Mountain Wilderness from the summit of Giant Mountain.

- Location within the United States
- Location: Adirondack Park New York USA
- Nearest city: North River, NY
- Coordinates: 44°3′38″N 73°46′9″W
- Area: 45,208 acres (18,295 ha)
- Governing body: New York State Department of Environmental Conservation

The Dix Mountain Wilderness Area is the name previously given to an area of New York's Forest Preserve in the Adirondack Park located in the towns of Elizabethtown, Keene and North Hudson, Essex County. It was roughly bounded on the north by NY 73, on the east by the Adirondack Northway (Interstate 87), on the south by Blue Ridge Road and on the west by Elk Lake Club and Ausable Club lands.

In 2018 the Dix Mountain Wilderness Area was merged with the High Peaks Wilderness Area after New York State acquired several parcels of land connecting the two wilderness areas.

== Geography ==
The terrain is rough, rocky and mountainous, with several of the mountain tops exceeding 4,000 feet (1,220 m). The area contains 12 small ponds with a total surface area of about 92 acres (37 ha). Vertical cliffs of considerable height are common, particularly in the northern and eastern parts.

Some of the mountains, such as Dix, South Dix and Macomb, have had small landslides in recent years which occur mostly on the near vertical north slopes. This has left a series of prominent, bare rock scars on the upper slopes.

There are four trailless peaks in the area — South Dix, East Dix, Hough and Macomb — that are over 4,000 feet in elevation. These mountains can be approached from a popular, unmaintained trail off NY 73 which provides access to a slide scramble up East Dix. From there, all the major peaks are connected by game trails.

=== Forest ===
The Adirondack Fire, one of the most severe and extensive forest fires of the Adirondacks, occurred in this area during a prolonged drought period in 1903. As a result, the tops and upper slopes of the mountains not only lost their forest cover but the humus was also consumed and the mineral soil eroded down to bare rock.

The present forest cover consists chiefly of pole-size yellow birch, aspen and stunted balsam at the higher elevations with mixed hardwoods and softwoods on the better soils at lower elevations.

== Recreation ==
The area contains 36.5 miles (58.7 km) of maintained foot trails, 2 lean-tos. The area also has a significant number of popular but unmaintained trails; in fact, four high peaks within the area are only accessible by unmaintained trails. The area also includes Chapel Pond, a high mountain lake surrounded by cliffs that is a popular destination for rock climbing and ice climbing.

== History ==
The Adirondack Trail Improvement Society, with headquarters at St. Huberts, maintains a system of foot trails in the northern and northwestern part of the area, with approval of the DEC. Their trails extend to such mountain tops as Round Top Mountain, Noonmark, Bear Den, Dial, Nippletop, Colvin, Blake and Pinnacle. The steep, rugged terrain, characteristic of nearly the whole area, has been responsible for the region's retaining a wilderness atmosphere. This, together with other accompanying features, lends itself well to the classification into which it has been placed.

The state, in 1978 and 1980, purchased in fee 9,311 acres (37.7 km^{2}) from the private Adirondack Mountain Reserve. Approximately 3,269 acres (13 km^{2}) became part of the Dix Mountain Wilderness as a result, including the following summits: Noonmark, Bear Den, Dial, Colvin, and Pinnacle. The state was given a conservation easement on the remaining Adirondack Mountain Reserve lands generally below 2,500 feet (760 m) in elevation, limiting the future development potential of these lands while permitting the public to cross lands still held in fee by the Club, on foot, to reach the peaks.

In 2013, New York State acquired a 1,450-acre parcel on the western boundary of the Dix Mountain Wilderness Area known as the Casey Brook Tract. In 2016, the 20,700-acre Boreas Ponds Tract was also acquired by the state, thereby creating a connection of state-owned land between the Dix Mountain Wilderness Area and the nearby High Peaks Wilderness Area. In 2018, the Adirondack Park Agency recommended, and Governor Andrew Cuomo approved, the merging of the Dix Mountain Wilderness Area into the High Peaks Wilderness Area.

== See also ==
- List of Wilderness Areas in the Adirondack Park
