= Grace Peak =

Mountain located in Essex County, New York

- Location within New York Adirondack Park Location within the United States

Highest point
- Elevation: 4,012 ft (1,223 m) NGVD 29
- Listing: Adirondack High Peaks 42nd
- Coordinates: 44°03′55″N 73°45′26″W

Geography
- Location: North Hudson, Essex County, New York
- Parent range: Dix Range
- Topo map: USGS Mount Marcy

Climbing
- First ascent: August 13, 1921, by Bob Marshall, George Marshall, and Herbert Clark
- Easiest route: Hike

Grace Peak is a mountain located in Essex County, New York. It is part of the Dix Range, named after John A. Dix (1798–1879), New York Secretary of State in 1837, and later Governor. The mountain was formerly called East Dix, but in 2014 it was officially renamed Grace Peak in honor of Grace Hudowalski (1906–2004), who in 1937 became the ninth person and first woman to climb all 46 of the Adirondack High Peaks. Grace Peak is flanked to the northeast by Spotted Mountain, and to the southwest by South Dix.

The northwest side of Grace Peak drains into the headwaters of the South Fork of the Boquet River, thence into Lake Champlain, which drains into Canada's Richelieu River, the Saint Lawrence River, and into the Gulf of Saint Lawrence. The east side of Grace Peak drains into Lindsay Brook, thence into the Schroon River, the Hudson River, and into New York Bay. The south side of Grace Peak drains into West Mill Brook, thence into the Schroon River.

Grace Peak is within the Dix Mountain Wilderness Area of Adirondack State Park.

== See also ==
- List of mountains in New York
- Northeast 111 4,000-footers
- Adirondack High Peaks
- Adirondack Forty-Sixers
