= MacNaughton Mountain =

Mountain in New York, United States

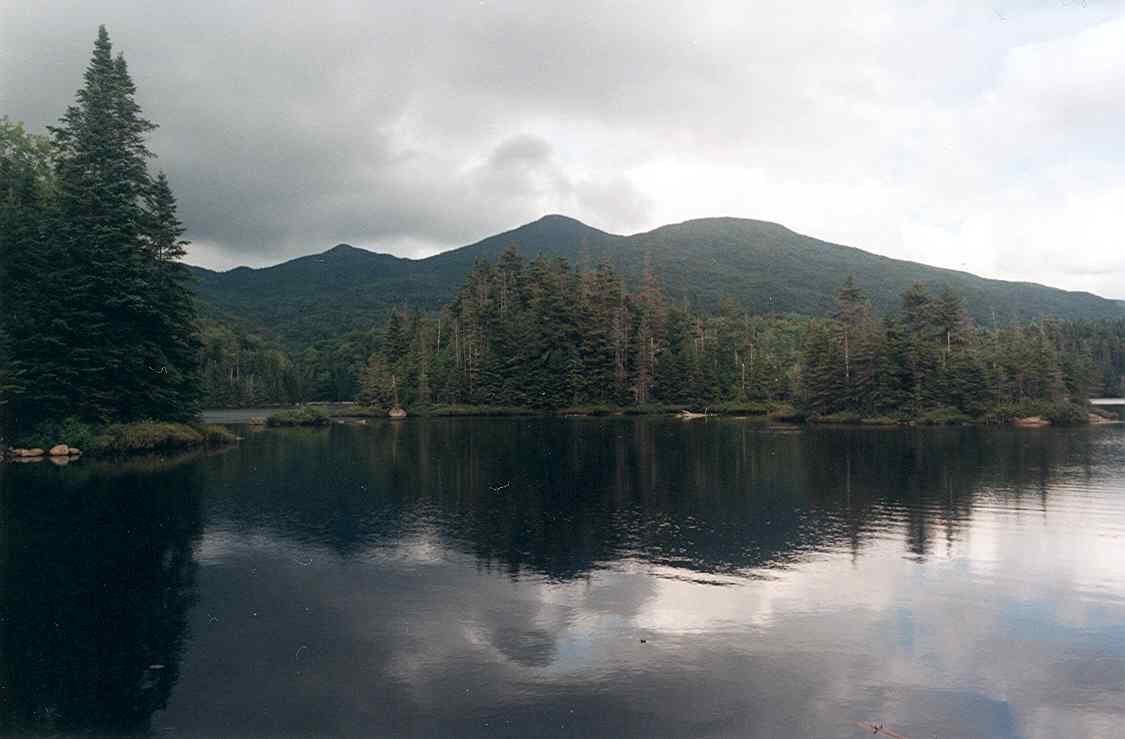
- MacNaughton Mt. (summit centre) seen from Duck Hole

Highest point
- Elevation: 3,983 ft (1,214 m)
- Prominence: 833 ft (254 m)
- Listing: Adirondack High Peaks
- Coordinates: 44°08′23″N 74°03′52″W

Geography
- Location: North Elba, Essex County, New York
- Parent range: Street Range
- Topo map: USGS Ampersand Lake

MacNaughton Mountain is a mountain located in Essex County, New York, named after James MacNaughton (1851–1905), the grandson of Archibald McIntyre. The mountain is part of the Street Range of the Adirondack Mountains.

The western slopes and north end of MacNaughton Mountain drain into Preston Ponds and Duck Hole pond, the source of the Cold River, which drains into the Raquette River, the Saint Lawrence River in Canada, and into the Gulf of Saint Lawrence. The eastern slopes and south end of MacNaughton Mtn. drain into the southern Indian Pass Brook, thence into Henderson Lake, the source of the Hudson River, and into New York Bay.

MacNaughton Mountain is within the High Peaks Wilderness Area of New York's Adirondack Park.

According to early surveys, MacNaughton Mountain's elevation was 3,976 ft (1,212 m), short of the 4,000 ft needed to qualify it as one of the Adirondack High Peaks. According to the 1953 survey, the mountain did reach that height, while four of the 46 peaks on the list fell short. However, the list was kept the same because those were the original 46. Since then, a survey has measured the elevation at exactly 3,983 ft (1,214 m).

Because it is not one of the officially recognized Adirondack High Peaks and it does not offer notable views, MacNaughton is not climbed as frequently as many other mountains. There is no maintained trail or clear herd path for most of the climb from the end of the nearest trail at Wallface Pond.

== See also ==
- List of mountains in New York
- Northeast 111 4,000-footers
- Adirondack High Peaks
- Adirondack Forty-Sixers
