= Hough Peak =

Mountain in New York, United States

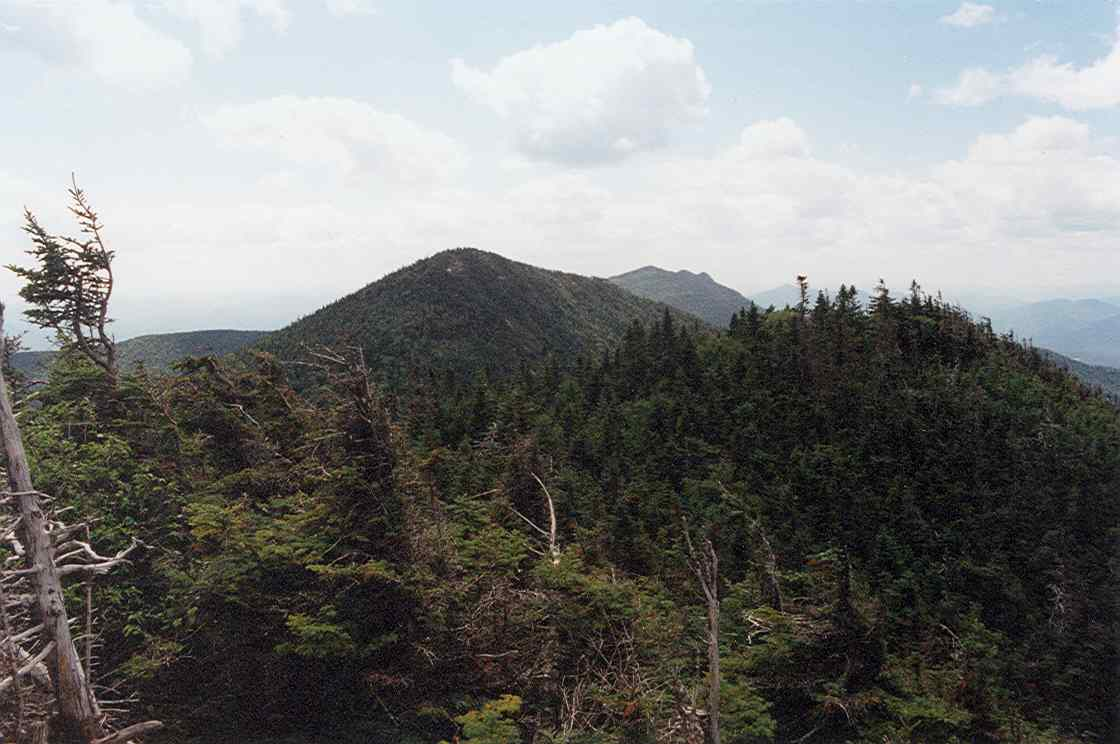
- Hough Peak (center) seen from the ridge to Dix Mt.

Highest point
- Elevation: 4,400 ft (1,300 m) NGVD 29
- Listing: Adirondack High Peaks 23rd
- Coordinates: 44°04′10″N 73°46′39″W

Geography
- Location within New York Adirondack Park Location within the United States
- Location: North Hudson, Essex County, New York
- Parent range: Dix Range
- Topo map: USGS Mount Marcy

Climbing
- First ascent: August 13, 1921, by Bob Marshall, George Marshall, and Herbert Clark
- Easiest route: Dix Range Herd Path

Hough Peak (/ˈhʌf/) is a mountain in the Dix Range of the Adirondacks in the U.S. state of New York. It is the 23rd-highest of the Adirondack High Peaks, with an elevation of 4,400 feet (1,300 m). The mountain is located in the High Peaks Wilderness Area, in the town of North Hudson in Essex County. It is named for Franklin B. Hough, an early Adirondack conservationist and forester.

== History ==
Hough Peak was called "Middle Dix" or "Little Dix" prior to 1927, after New York governor John Adams Dix. The earliest recorded ascent of the mountain was made on August 31, 1921, by brothers Bob and George Marshall and their friend Herbert Clark. The trio completed the ascent as part of a challenge they had devised to climb all peaks over 4,000 feet (1,200 m) in the Adirondacks, which eventually evolved into the list of the 46 Adirondack High Peaks.

In 1927, Russell Carson proposed renaming the mountain "Mount Marshall" in honor of the Marshall brothers in his book Peaks and People of the Adirondacks. The book sold well and popularized the new name, although the Marshall brothers were opposed to having a mountain named after them. Objections were also made to naming peaks after living persons in the Adirondack Mountain Club, although these came primarily from antisemitic members who did not want the name of the Jewish Marshall family attached to a mountain. Club member Theodore Van Wyck Anthony succeeded in having Carson's proposed names removed from club maps in 1928. In 1937, the state Board on Geographic Names instead renamed Middle Dix to "Hough Peak", after Franklin B. Hough, at the request of the New York State Conservation Department. The name Mount Marshall was eventually applied to another mountain in the MacIntyre Mountains in 1942, following a petition from the Adirondack Forty-Sixers.

== Ascent routes ==
Hough Peak is only accessible to hikers on the Dix Range Crest Path, an unmarked trail which connects the peaks of the Dix Range. The path connects Hough to the summits of neighboring Dix Mountain and South Dix; hikers must first ascend one or the other to access Hough.

== See also ==
- List of mountains in New York
- Northeast 111 4,000-footers
- Adirondack High Peaks
- Adirondack Forty-Sixers
