= Dix Mountain =

Mountain in New York, United States

- Dix's distinctive slides, seen from Noonmark

Highest point
- Elevation: 4,857 ft (1,480 m) NGVD 29
- Listing: #6 Adirondack High Peaks
- Coordinates: 44°04′56″N 73°47′11″W

Geography
- Location within New York Adirondack Park Location within the United States
- Location: Keene / North Hudson, New York, U.S.
- Parent range: Dix
- Topo map: USGS Mount Marcy

Climbing
- First ascent: 1807 by Rykert and party
- Easiest route: Hike

Dix Mountain is a mountain in the Dix Range of the Adirondacks in the U.S. state of New York. With an elevation of 4,857 feet (1,480 m), it is the sixth-highest peak in New York and one of the 46 Adirondack High Peaks. It is located roughly on the boundary between the towns of North Hudson and Keene in Essex County, and in the High Peaks Wilderness Area of Adirondack Park. The crest of the peak consists of a very narrow ridge, which continues to the southeast and rises to a subsidiary peak named Beckhorn, then continues south to other peaks of the Dix Range. The summit is also in an alpine zone above the treeline. The ridge offers unobstructed views of Elk Lake to the southwest, the Great Range to the northwest, and Lake Champlain and the Green Mountains to the east.

The mountain was reportedly first climbed in 1807 by a man named Rykert in the course of surveying the town line. The peak was given its current name by state geologist Ebenezer Emmons, who named it in 1837 after John Adams Dix, who was the Secretary of State of New York at the time, and later became the state's governor.

== Ascent routes ==
Approaching from Elk Lake to the south, hikers can climb the mountain from several routes. The Hunters Pass Trail begins at the Elk Lake parking lot and is closed during the big game hunting season. It proceeds north, parallel to the Dix Range, and passes through Hunter's Pass before intersecting the Round Pond Trail, after which it turns and ascends Dix mountain from the north. This route is 7.4 miles (11.9 km) and involves and elevation gain of 2,800 feet (850 m). Lean-tos are located along the trail at Slide Brook, 2.3 miles (3.7 km) from the trailhead, and Lillian Brook, 3.6 miles (5.8 km) from the trailhead. An alternative route is to take the Dix Trail from its junction with the Hunters Pass Trail along a steeper but shorter route to Beckhorn and from there to the summit. This route is 6.6 miles (10.6 km) from the Elk Lake parking lot to the summit. Hikers wishing to cover other peaks in the Dix Range can follow an unmarked trail to the summit of Macomb Mountain, or follow an unmarked trail from Lillian Brook to the ridge between Hough Peak, South Dix, and Macomb Mountain, and travel north on the crest ridge.

Dix Mountain can also be approached from the north on the Round Pond Trail beginning at New York State Route 73, which is maintained by the Adirondack Forty-Sixers. The trail is 7.4 miles (11.9 km) to the summit for an elevation gain of 3,200 feet (980 m). A lean-to is located 4.6 miles (7.4 km) from the trailhead. At 6.7 miles (10.8 km), this trail has a junction with the Hunter's Pass Trail from Elk lake, before turning up the ridge of the mountain to the summit.

A history of landslides has left Dix Mountain with several slide tracks which can be climbed instead of hiking. The Buttress Slide on the western face of the mountain can be accessed from the Hunters Pass Trail 5.5 miles (8.9 km) from Elk Lake and continues 1,450 feet (440 m) to the summit with 900 feet (270 m) of elevation gain. The climb is rated a 5.4 on the Yosemite Decimal System due to the slope and features.

== Climate ==
Climate data for Dix Mountain 44.0829 N, 73.7822 W, Elevation: 4,288 ft (1,307 m) (1991–2020 normals)
Month	Jan	Feb	Mar	Apr	May	Jun	Jul	Aug	Sep	Oct	Nov	Dec	Year
Mean daily maximum °F (°C)	18.3 (−7.6)	20.0 (−6.7)	27.4 (−2.6)	43.6 (6.4)	55.8 (13.2)	64.1 (17.8)	68.4 (20.2)	67.2 (19.6)	61.7 (16.5)	49.2 (9.6)	33.1 (0.6)	23.7 (−4.6)	44.4 (6.9)
Daily mean °F (°C)	10.3 (−12.1)	11.9 (−11.2)	19.6 (−6.9)	33.6 (0.9)	46.2 (7.9)	55.2 (12.9)	59.9 (15.5)	58.6 (14.8)	52.6 (11.4)	40.5 (4.7)	26.7 (−2.9)	16.9 (−8.4)	36.0 (2.2)
Mean daily minimum °F (°C)	2.4 (−16.4)	3.9 (−15.6)	11.8 (−11.2)	23.6 (−4.7)	36.6 (2.6)	46.4 (8.0)	51.4 (10.8)	50.0 (10.0)	43.5 (6.4)	31.7 (−0.2)	20.3 (−6.5)	10.1 (−12.2)	27.6 (−2.4)
Average precipitation inches (mm)	5.24 (133)	4.14 (105)	5.34 (136)	7.11 (181)	7.38 (187)	7.00 (178)	7.00 (178)	6.32 (161)	6.66 (169)	7.63 (194)	6.69 (170)	6.52 (166)	77.03 (1,958)
Source: PRISM Climate Group

== Gallery ==
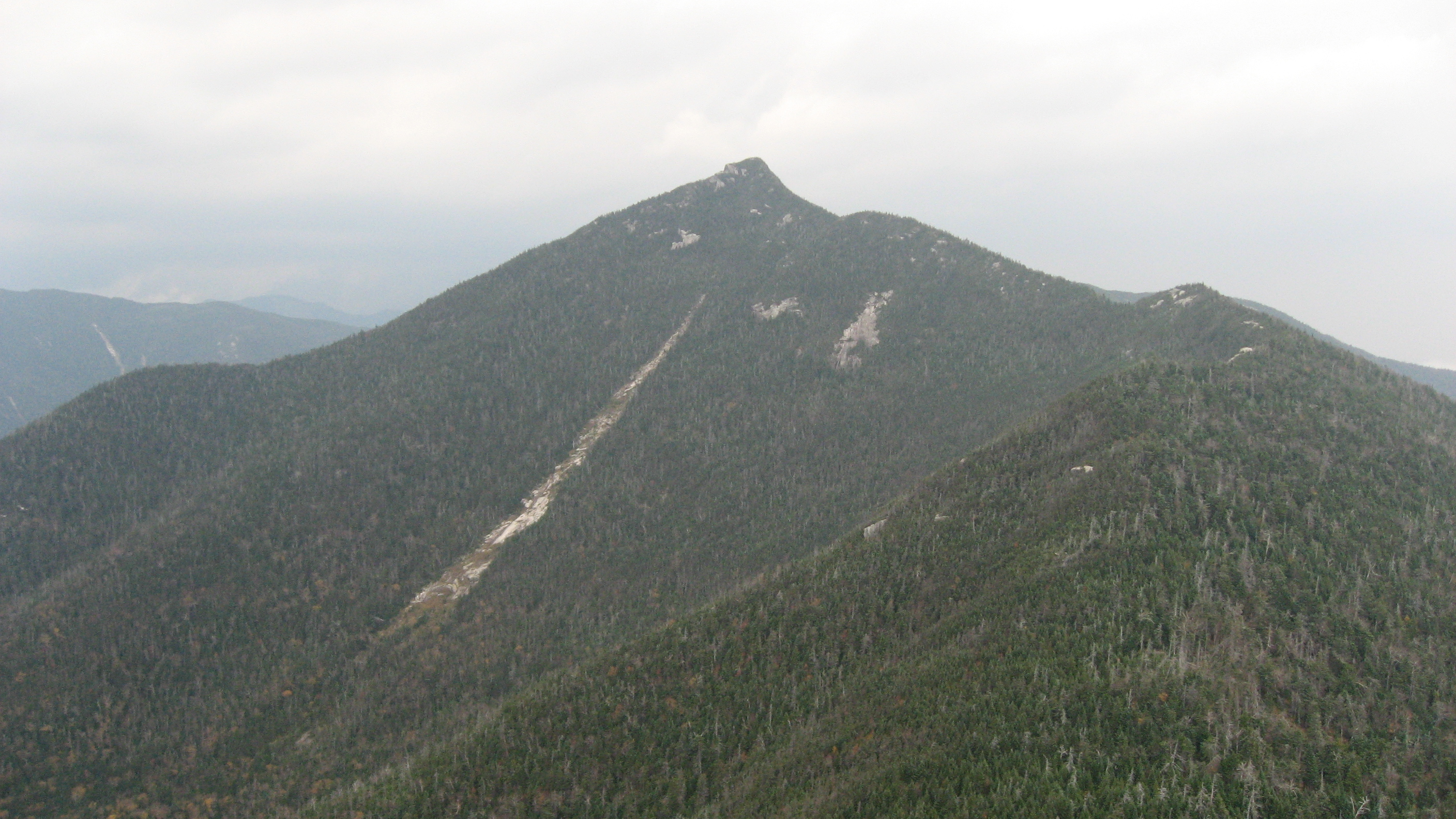
As seen from Hough Peak

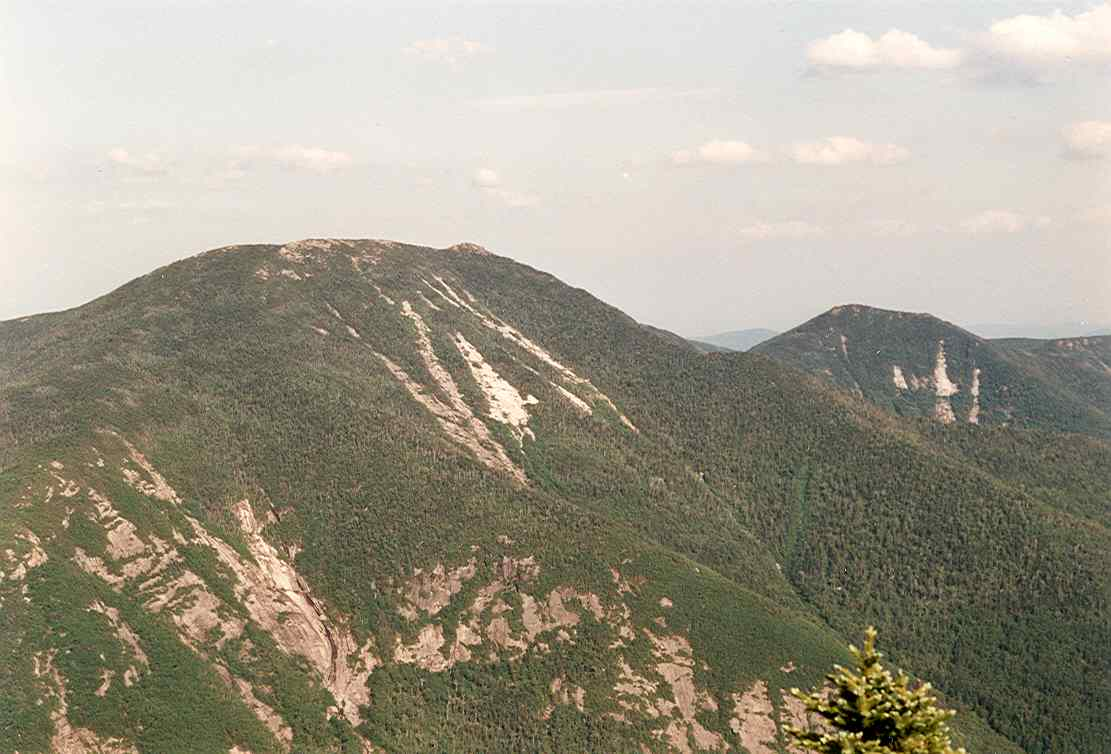
Dix Mt. and Hough Peak seen from Nippletop

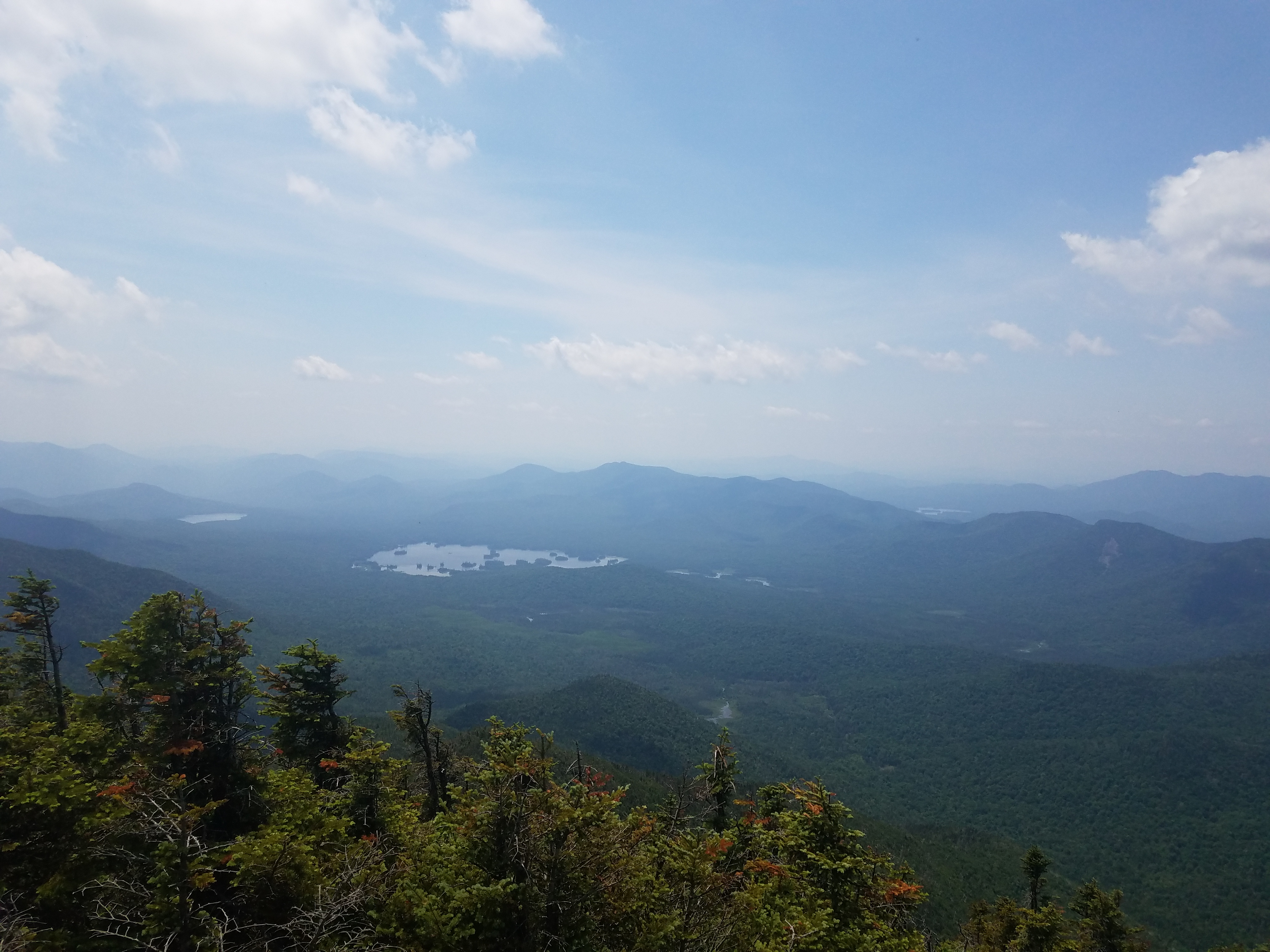
View from Dix Mountain Peak on July 1, 2018, looking towards Elk Lake.
