= Dix Range =

Mountain range in the Adirondacks, New York

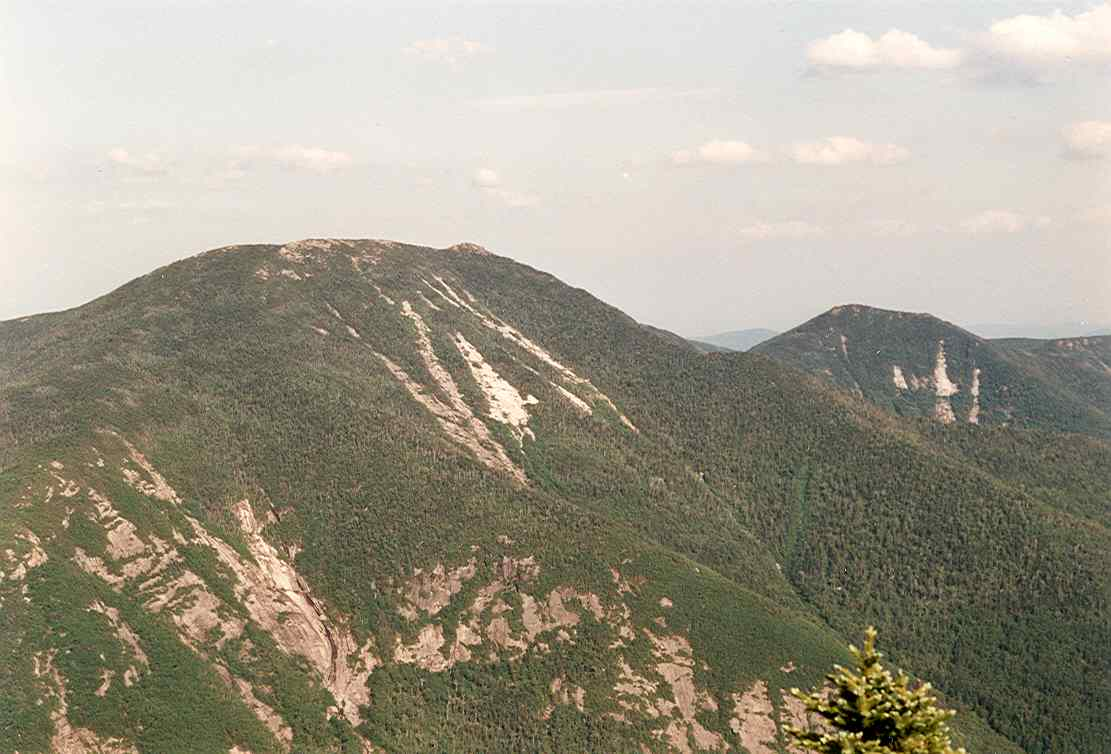
- Dix Mountain and Hough Peak seen from Nippletop.

Highest point
- Peak: Dix Mountain
- Elevation: 4,855 ft (1,480 m)
- Coordinates: 44°4′56″N 73°47′11″W

Dimensions
- Length: 12 mi (19 km) North South
- Width: 9 mi (14 km) East West
- Area: 68 km^{2} (26 mi^{2})

Naming
- Etymology: Named for John Adams Dix

Geography
- Location within New York
- Country: United States
- State: New York
- Region: Adirondack Park
- District: High Peaks
- Range coordinates: 44°04′N 73°46′W
- Parent range: Adirondack Mountains

The Dix Range is a range of mountains in the High Peaks region of the Adirondacks, southeast of Mount Marcy and the Ausable valley, in northeastern New York State. The Dixes are named for John Adams Dix, then Secretary of State under New York Governor William Marcy, later Senator, U.S. Secretary of the Treasury, and New York Governor. The only exception to this is the mountain formerly named East Dix, which in 2014 was renamed Grace Peak in honor of Grace Leach Hudowalski (1906–2004), who in 1937 became the ninth person and first woman to climb all 46 of the Adirondack High Peaks.

The range includes Hough Peak, and Macomb Mountain, Grace Peak, South Dix, and Dix Mountain, the sixth highest peak in the state. The range is approximately 12 miles (19 km) long by 9 miles (14 km) wide in a "V" shape, with Macomb at the point of the V.

== See also ==
- List of mountains in New York
