= Couchsachraga Peak =

Mountain in New York, United States

- Couchsachraga Peak from the summit of Panther Peak

Highest point
- Elevation: 3,820 ft (1,160 m) NGVD 29
- Listing: Adirondack High Peaks 46th
- Coordinates: 44°05′44″N 74°09′37″W

Geography
- Location within New York Adirondack Park Location within the United States
- Location: Newcomb, Essex County, New York
- Parent range: Santanoni Range
- Topo map: USGS Santanoni Peak

Climbing
- First ascent: June 23, 1924, by Bob Marshall, George Marshall, and Herbert Clark
- Easiest route: Hike

Couchsachraga Peak is a mountain located in Essex County, New York. "Couchsachraga" is based on an Algonquin or Huron name for the area, meaning "dismal wilderness". The mountain is part of the Santanoni Range of the Adirondacks. Couchsachraga Peak is flanked to the east by Panther Peak. There is no marked trail to the summit, which, being fully forested, has no views.

Couchsachraga Peak stands within the watershed of the Cold River, which drains into the Raquette River, the Saint Lawrence River in Canada, and into the Gulf of Saint Lawrence. The southern sides of Couchsachraga drains into Calahan Brook, thence into Moose Creek and the Cold River. The northeast and northern sides of Couchsachraga drain via several brooks into the Cold River.

According to the 1897 survey of the Adirondacks, the height of Couchsachraga Peak was over 4,000 feet (1,219 m), so it was included in the 46 High Peaks; the 1953 USGS found it and three other peaks to be lower, but the list has not been changed. Couchsachraga is within New York's Adirondack Park.

== See also ==
- List of mountains in New York
- Northeast 111 4,000-footers
- Adirondack High Peaks
- Adirondack Forty-Sixers
