= Street Mountain (New York) =

Mountain in the United States

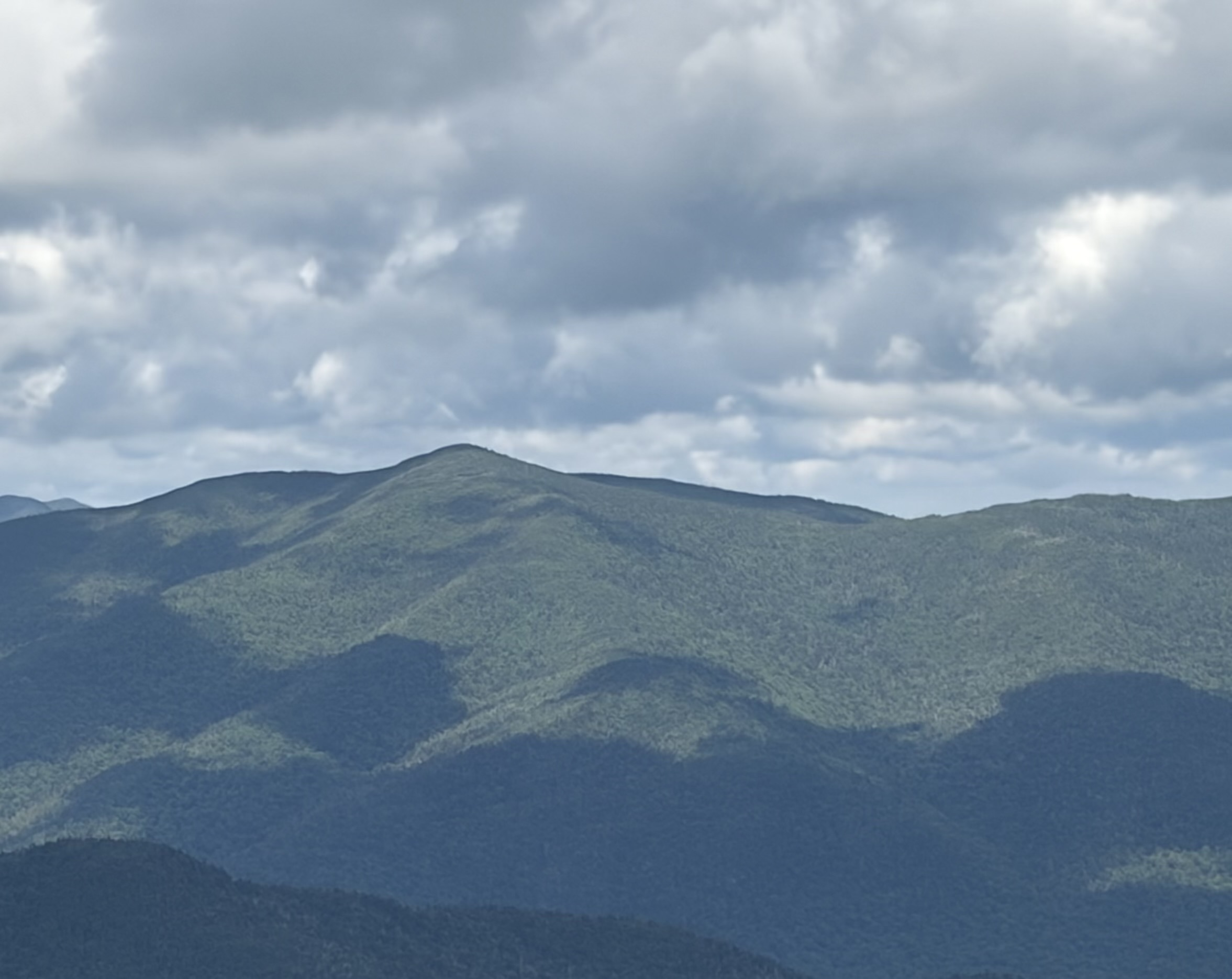
- Street Mountain viewed from Phelps Mountain

Highest point
- Elevation: 4,166 ft (1,270 m) NGVD 29
- Listing: Adirondack High Peaks 31st
- Coordinates: 44°10′47″N 74°02′38″W

Geography
- Location within New York Adirondack Park Location within the United States
- Location: North Elba, Essex County, New York
- Parent range: Street Range
- Topo map: USGS Ampersand Lake

Climbing
- First ascent: June 27, 1921, by Bob Marshall, George Marshall, and Herbert Clark

Street Mountain is a mountain in the Great Range of the Adirondack Mountains in the U.S. state of New York. It is the 31st-highest of the Adirondack High Peaks, with an elevation of 4,166 feet (1,270 m). It is located in the town of North Elba in Essex County. Nye Mountain is located on the ridge of Street. The mountain was named in 1872 by surveyor Verplanck Colvin after New York State Librarian Alfred Billings Street. The first recorded ascent was made on June 27, 1921, by conservationist brothers Bob Marshall and George Marshall, and their friend Herbert Clark. There is an trail to the summit of the mountain which diverges from the Indian Pass Trail 0.1 miles (0.16 km) from the trailhead at Adirondak Loj. After another 251 yards (230 m), the trail splits again, with the marked trail continuing to Mount Jo and the unmarked trail continuing to Street and Nye Mountains. The unmarked trail crosses Indian Brook and continues up the slope of Nye Mountain to its summit, then onward to the summit of Street, 4.0 miles (6.4 km) from the Adirondak Loj.

== Gallery ==
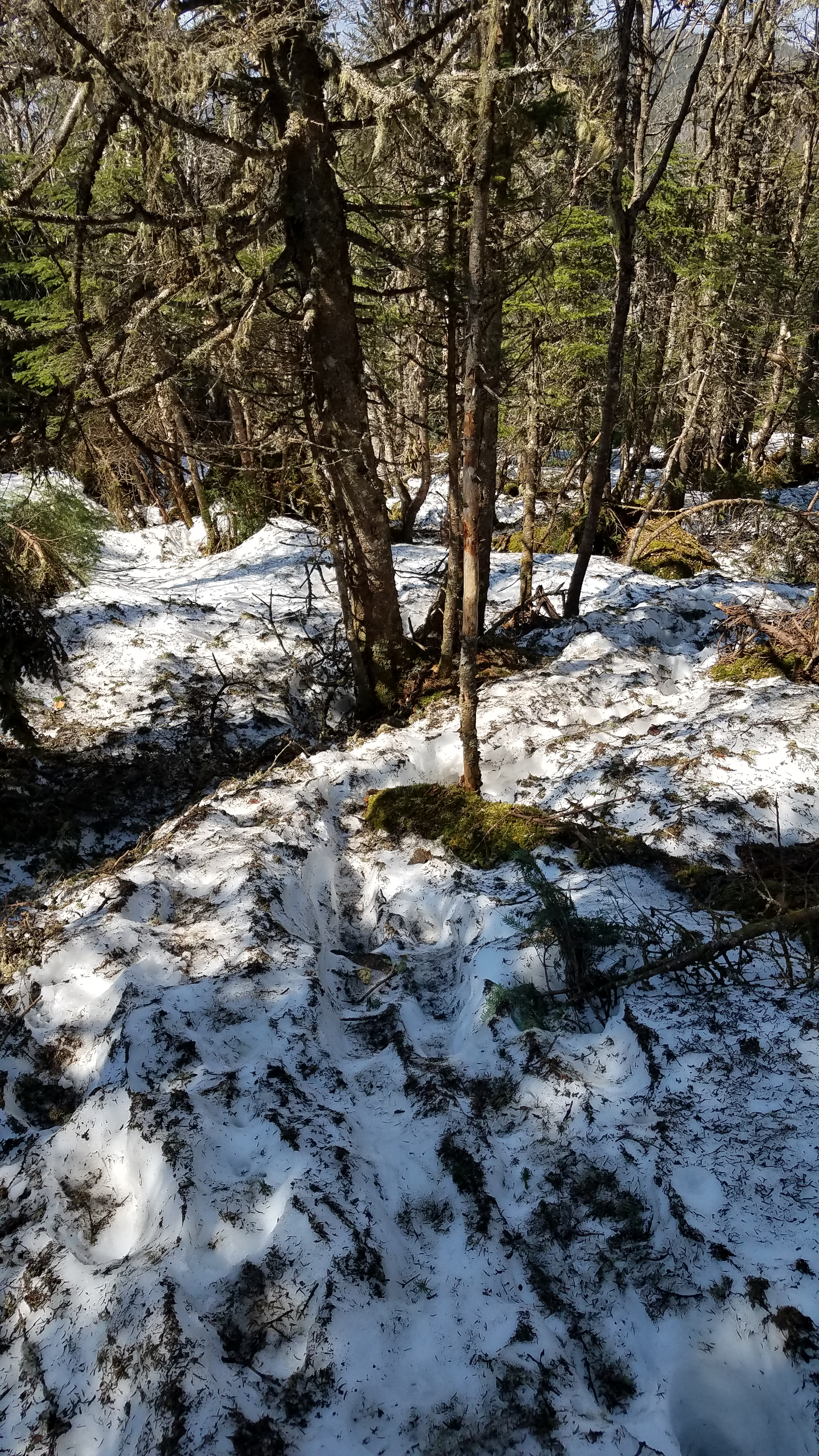
Snow conditions descending Street Mountain on a warm May day.

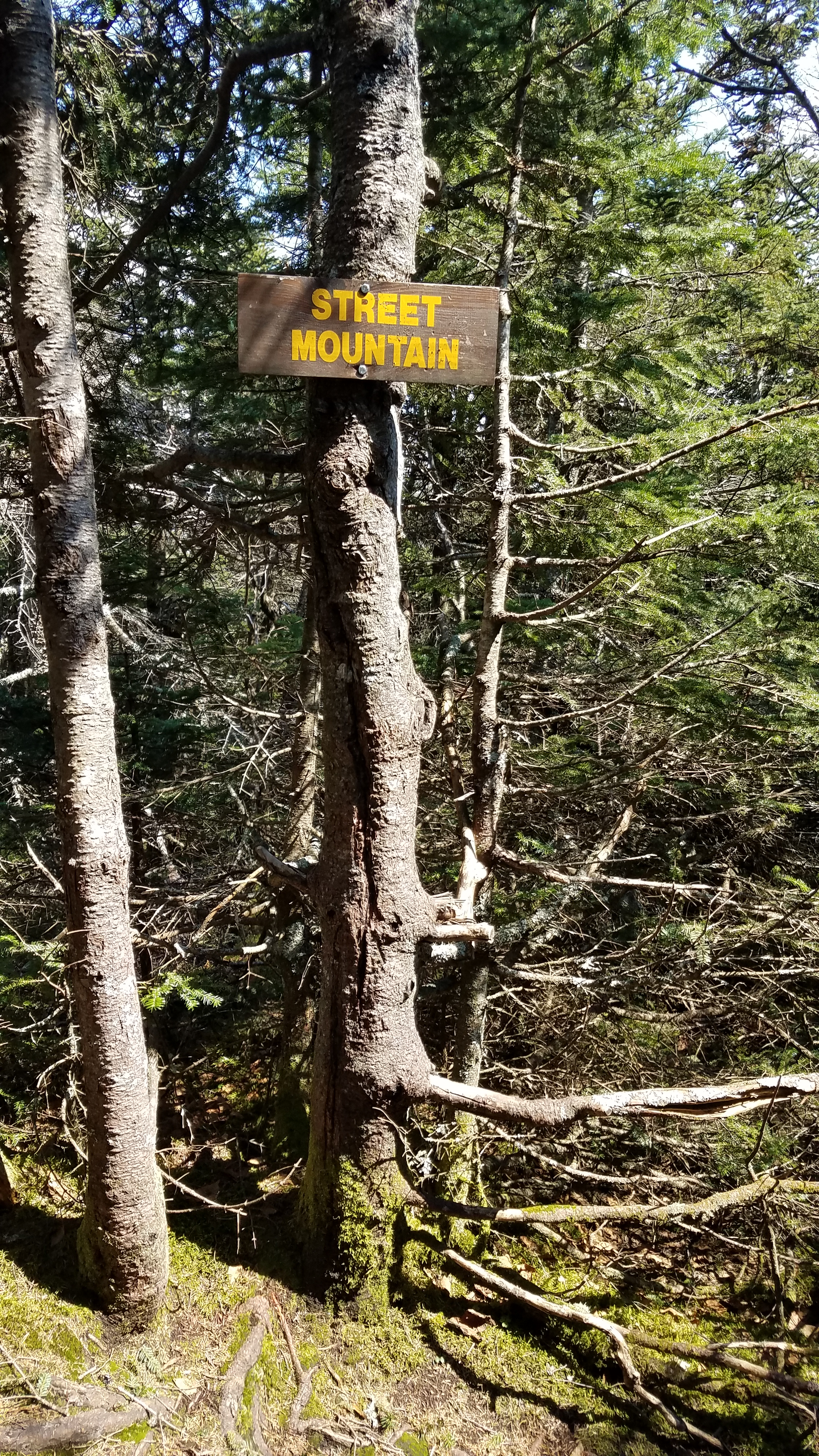
The marker at Street Mountain's summit

== See also ==
- List of mountains in New York
- Northeast 111 4,000-footers
- Adirondack High Peaks
- Adirondack Forty-Sixers
