= Nye Mountain =

Mountain in New York, United States

Nye Mountain (south peak)
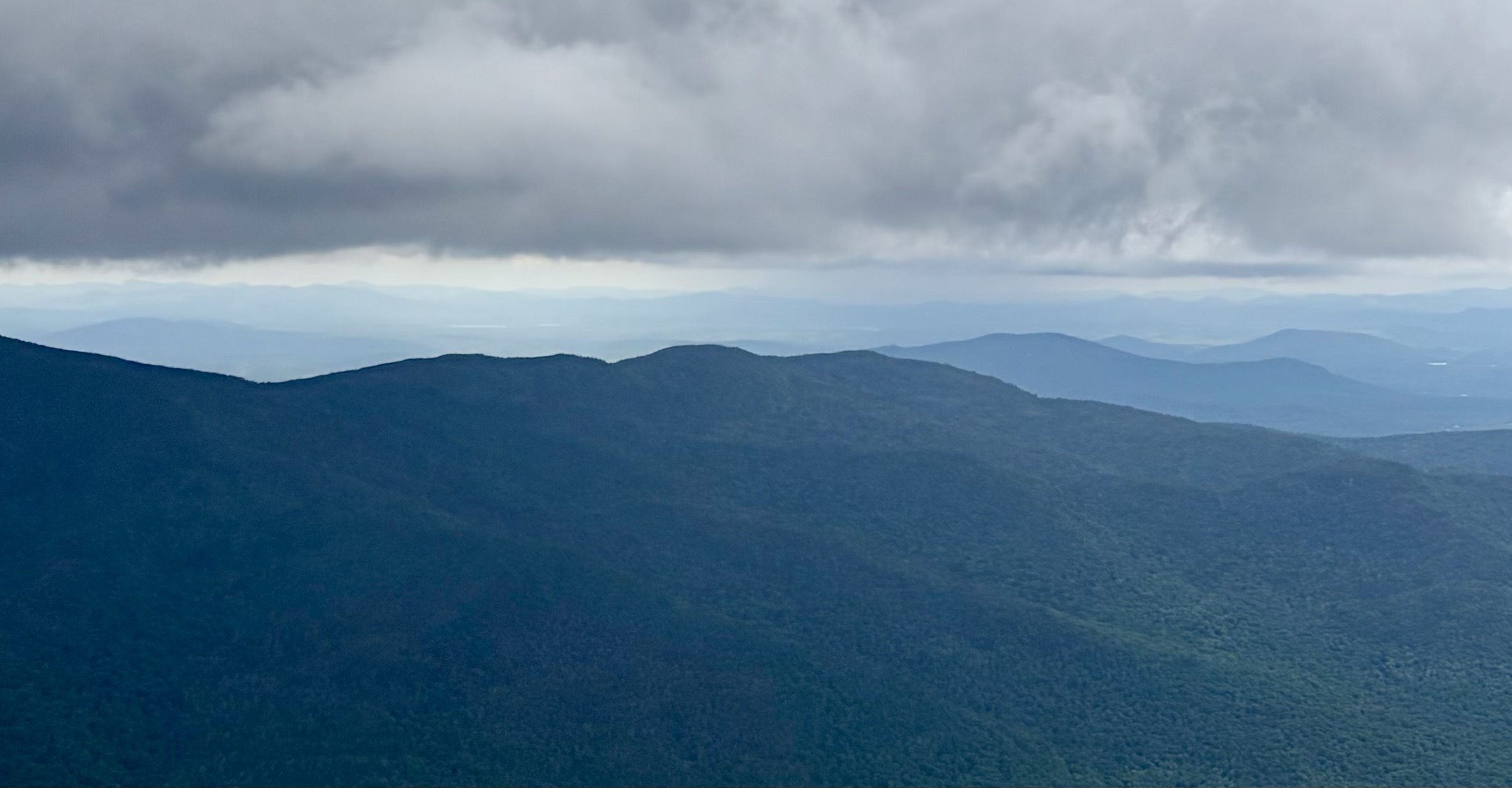
- Nye Mountain photographed from Wright Peak

Highest point
- Elevation: 3,895 ft (1,187 m) NGVD 29
- Listing: Adirondack High Peaks 45th
- Coordinates: 44.18726°N 74.02382°W

Geography
- Location within New York Adirondack Park Location within the United States
- Location: North Elba, Essex County, New York
- Parent range: Street Range
- Topo map: USGS Ampersand Lake

Climbing
- First ascent: June 27, 1921, by Bob Marshall, George Marshall, and Herbert Clark
- Easiest route: Hike

Nye Mountain is a mountain located in Essex County, New York, named after William B. Nye (c.1815–1893), an Adirondack mountain guide. Nye Mountain is part of the Street Range of the Adirondack Mountains; it is flanked to the southwest by Street Mountain.

Nye Mountain stands within the watershed of the West Branch of the Ausable River, which drains into Lake Champlain, thence into Canada's Richelieu River, the Saint Lawrence River, and into the Gulf of Saint Lawrence. The west side of Nye Mtn. drains into the headwaters of the Chubb River, thence into the West Branch. The north end of Nye Mtn. drains into the Chubb River. The east side of Nye Mtn. drains into the northern Indian Pass Brook, thence into the Ausable's West Branch.

Nye Mountain is within New York's Adirondack Park.

According to the 1901 USGS survey, Nye Mountain's elevation was 4,170 ft (1,271 m), and its peak was 540 ft (165 m) above the col separating it from Street Mountain — more than the 4,000 ft (1,200 m) of elevation and 300 ft (91 m) of prominence needed to qualify for inclusion on the list of the Adirondack High Peaks. However, the 1953 survey measured the elevation to be only 3,895 ft (1,187 m). The 1999 survey measured the nominal summit at 44.18726°N 74.02382°W to be only 1,170–1,180 m (3,839–3,871 ft) — less than a point 0.4 mi (0.6 km) south along the ridge to Street. Although Nye and three other mountains are no longer thought to meet the Adirondack Mountain Club's qualifications for the list of High Peaks, the club has chosen to keep the traditional list of peaks, without updating.

== See also ==
- List of mountains in New York
- Northeast 111 4,000-footers
- Adirondack High Peaks
- Adirondack Forty-Sixers
