= Dial Mountain =

Mountain in the United States

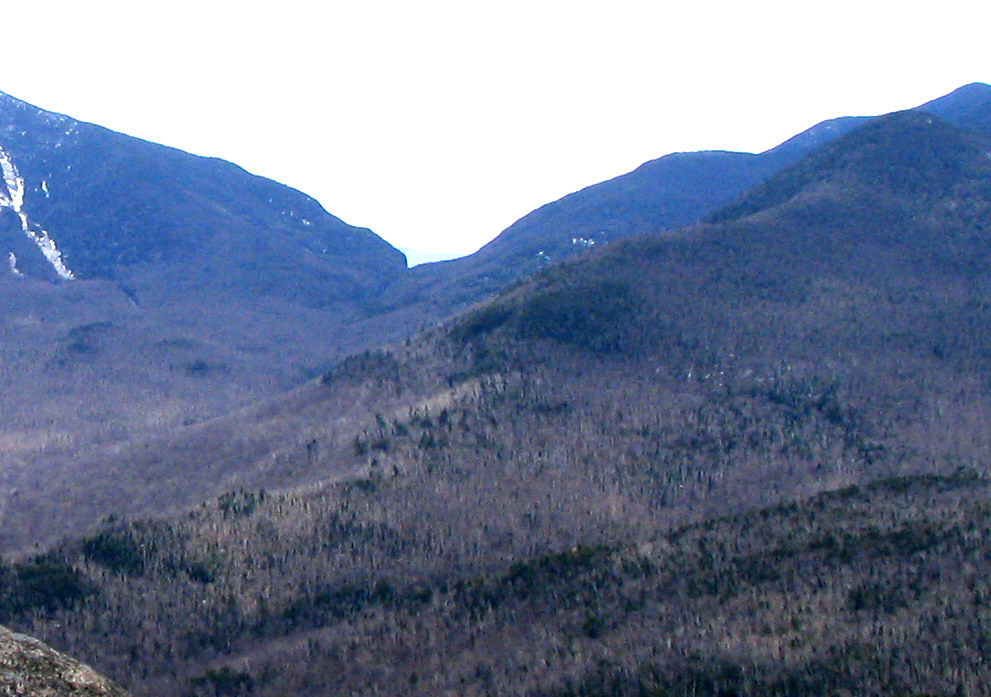
- Dial Mtn (near right) from Noonmark, showing Mount Dix (left), Hunter Pass, (center)

Highest point
- Elevation: 4,020 ft (1,230 m) NGVD 29
- Prominence: 164 ft (50 m)
- Listing: Adirondack High Peaks 41st
- Coordinates: 44°06′21″N 73°47′45″W

Geography
- Location within New York Adirondack Park Location within the United States
- Location: Keene, Essex County, New York
- Parent range: Colvin Range
- Topo map: USGS Mount Marcy

Climbing
- First ascent: 1884, by Ed Phelps and Ed Beede
- Easiest route: Hike

Dial Mountain is a mountain located in Essex County, New York. The mountain is part of the Colvin Range. Dial Mountain is flanked to the southwest by Nippletop.

Dial Mountain stands within the watershed of Lake Champlain, which drains into Canada's Richelieu River, the Saint Lawrence River, and into the Gulf of Saint Lawrence. The west side of Dial Mountain drains into Gill Brook, thence into the East Branch of Ausable River, and into Lake Champlain. The southeast side of Dial Mountain drains into the headwaters of the North Fork of the Boquet River, thence into Lake Champlain. The northeast side of Dial Mountain drains into Gravestone Brook, thence into the North Fork of the Boquet River.

== See also ==
- List of mountains in New York
- Northeast 111 4,000-footers
- Adirondack High Peaks
- Adirondack Forty-Sixers
