= Adirondack Forty-Sixers =

Mountain climber organization

The Adirondack Forty-Sixers are an organization of hikers who have climbed all forty-six of the traditionally recognized High Peaks of the Adirondack Mountains, in the U.S. state of New York. They are often referred to just as 46ers. As of 2024, there were over 16,000 registered forty-sixers. The organization primarily supports efforts to maintain the Adirondack High Peaks Wilderness, and encourages aspiring members through a correspondents program.

== History ==
=== Origins ===
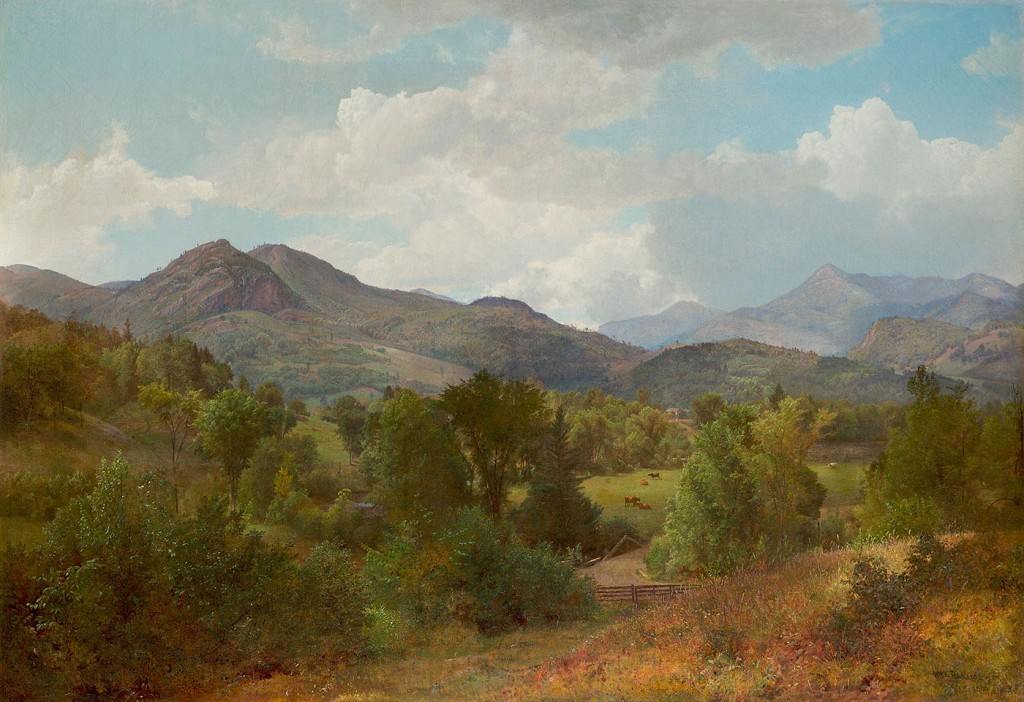
Bouquet Valley in the Adirondacks' by William Trost Richards, 1863

The first 46ers were brothers Robert and George Marshall, along with their guide and family friend Herbert Clark. The Marshalls spent much of their childhood in the Adirondacks, obsessing over the collection of Verplanck Colvin maps owned by their father, Louis Marshall. They devised criteria for the high peaks they would climb—every summit rising over 4,000 feet (1,200 m) above sea level was considered, and those with at least 300 feet (91 m) of vertical rise on all sides or separated from the next closest summit by 0.75 miles (1.21 km) were added to their list. They chose forty-two summits, and climbed them all between 1918 and 1924. While they initially planned to climb only the summits above 4,000 feet (1,200 m), they later climbed the four 4,000-foot (1,200 m) mountains as well on the suggestion of friends.

At the time that they undertook this goal, there were no trails up many of the peaks. This made summiting all forty-six a particularly formidable accomplishment. The trio first climbed Whiteface Mountain on August 1, 1918, and finished the 46 with Mount Emmons on June 10, 1925. One of the peaks, Mount Marshall in the MacIntyre Range has since been named in honor of Robert, and Herbert Brook (the most popular approach up Marshall) was named after their guide Herbert Clark.

=== Founding ===
As an organization, the Adirondack Forty-Sixers dates back to 1936. Ernest R. Ryder and Edward L. Hudowalski formed a social club originally known as the Troy Forty-Sixers for people who had successfully climbed all 46 of the Adirondack high peaks on the Marshalls' list. The club later expanded its membership, and was formally incorporated by the State of New York as the Adirondack Forty-Sixers in 1948.

=== Grace Hudowalski ===
In 1937, Grace Hudowalski became the ninth person and first woman to climb all 46 of the Adirondack High Peaks. In 2014, the mountain formerly known as East Dix was renamed Grace Peak after her due to this accomplishment. She would later go on to become the matriarch of the 46ers family, serving as club historian for over sixty years until she retired at age 90 in 1996. In May 2013, Summit Pictures, LLC and director Fred Schoewbel released The Mountains Will Wait for You, a documentary narrated by Johnny Cash celebrating the life of Grace Hudowalski.

== The Traditional 46 Peaks ==
Although many peaks that were pathless in the days of Marshall brothers now have well-traveled trails, tackling the 46 High Peaks remains a considerable challenge. Steep technical terrain is perhaps the greatest hurdle, as switchbacks are scarce. Fitness and sure footing are paramount when confronting the 46. Additionally, many peaks are tucked away miles from any trailhead, requiring climbers to find campgrounds or lean-to's to break up the trip. Ambitious day-hikers can also tackle these inaccessible peaks with alpine starts (before the sun rises) and long days of trekking.

List of Peaks and Elevations
Rank	Mountain	Elevation (feet)
1	Marcy	5344
2	Algonquin	5114
3	Haystack	4960
4	Skylight	4926
5	Whiteface	4867
6	Dix	4857
7	Gray	4840
8	Iroquois Peak	4840
9	Basin	4827
10	Gothics	4736
11	Colden	4714
12	Giant	4627
13	Nippletop	4620
14	Santanoni	4607
15	Redfield	4606
16	Wright Peak	4580
17	Saddleback	4515
18	Panther	4442
19	Table Top	4427
20	Rocky Peak Ridge	4420
21	Macomb	4405
22	Armstrong	4400
23	Hough	4400
24	Seward	4361
25	Marshall	4360
26	Allen	4340
27	Big Slide	4240
28	Esther	4240
29	Upper Wolf Jaw	4185
30	Lower Wolf Jaw	4175
31	Street	4166
32	Phelps	4161
33	Donaldson	4140
34	Seymour	4120
35	Sawteeth	4100
36	Cascade	4098
37	South Dix	4060
38	Porter	4059
39	Colvin	4057
40	Emmons	4040
41	Dial	4020
42	Grace Peak	4012
43	Blake Peak	3960
44	Cliff	3960
45	Nye	3895
46	Couchsachraga	3820

=== Exceptions and exclusions ===
Although later geographical surveys revealed that four of the peaks (Blake, Cliff, Nye, and Couchsachraga) were actually below four thousand feet in elevation, they remain a part of the list out of tradition. Additionally, it was discovered that another mountain, MacNaughton, had been overlooked and remains excluded from the list. Although rising to almost exactly four thousand feet, MacNaughton is not a requirement for aspiring Forty-Sixers.

== Membership and activity ==
As of November 2024, there were over 16,000 registered Forty-Sixers. Members are asked to pay dues in order to fund the club's activities—these include an annual outdoor skills workshop, trail maintenance and stewardship programs, and a "correspondents program" inspired by Grace Hudowalski. In the early days of the 46ers she wrote personal letters to aspiring members—a tradition continued to this day.

The 46ers are dedicated to the preservation and accessibility of Adirondack High Peaks Wilderness. They host trail maintenance events for registered members, as well as a trailhead steward program:

The 46ers collaborated with the ADK and DEC to establish the 46er Trailhead Steward Program. On weekends throughout the summer, 46er volunteers greet hikers at the Cascade trailhead and share information on DEC rules and regulations, "leave no trace" principles, and provide safety and preparedness suggestions.

== Winter 46ers ==
Some 46ers re-climb all the peaks in winter, and are awarded the "Winter 46er" distinction (the winter 46 season is considered to be from December 21 to March 21). This is a very difficult task due to the severity of winters in the Adirondacks. Some peaks, such as Gothics, can require some technical climbing skill when covered with snow and ice. Upon completion of the winter 46, 46ers are entitled to wear the "Winter 46-R" rocker patch. As of September 1, 2020, there were 934 Winter 46ers.
