= Macomb Mountain =

Mountain in the United States

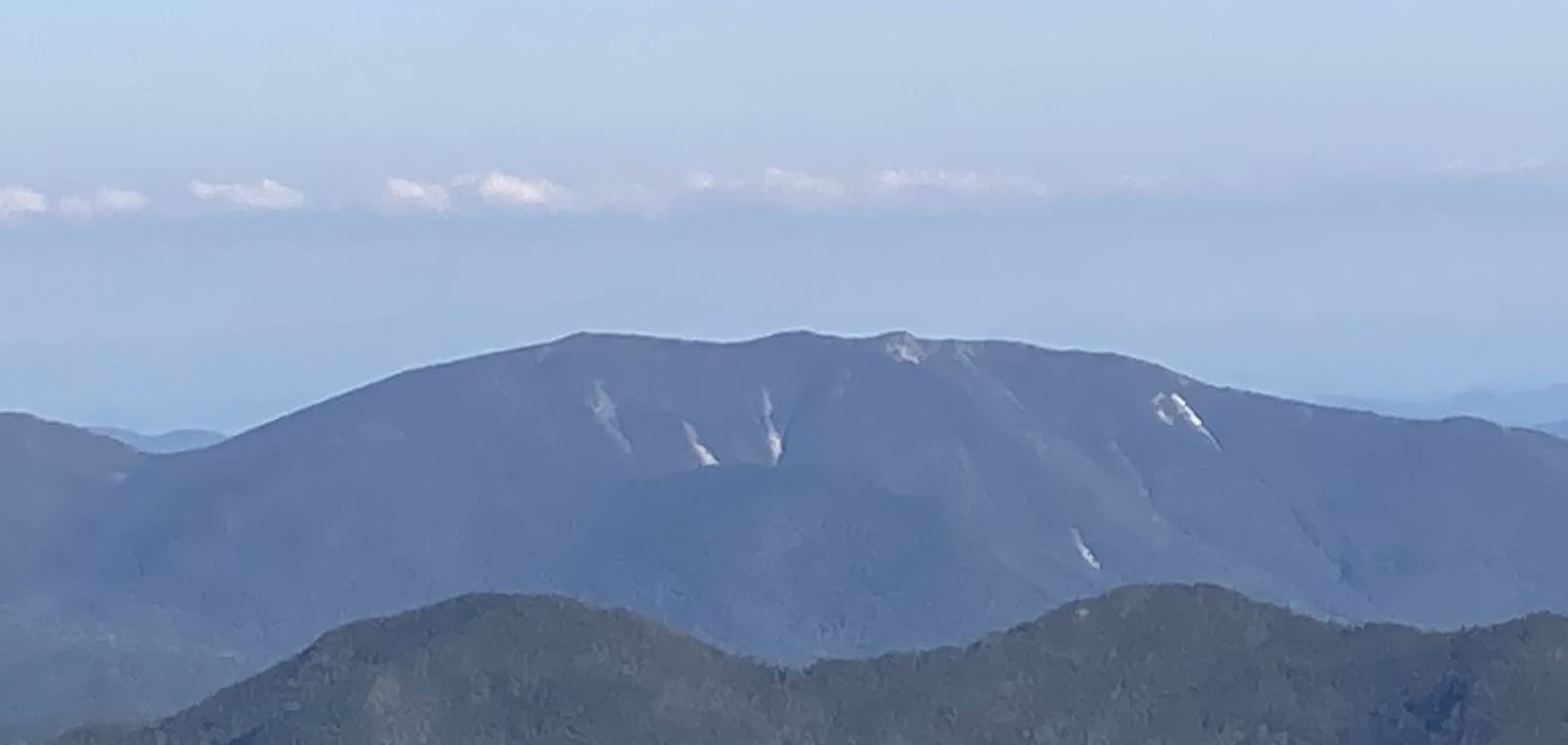
- Macomb Mountain photographed from Mount Haystack

Highest point
- Elevation: 4,405 ft (1,343 m) NGVD 29
- Listing: Adirondack High Peaks 21st
- Coordinates: 44°03′06″N 73°46′48″W

Geography
- Location within New York Adirondack Park Location within the United States
- Location: North Hudson, Essex County, New York
- Parent range: Dix Range
- Topo map: USGS Mount Marcy

Climbing
- First ascent: 1872, by Mel Trumbull and Arthur H. Wyant
- Easiest route: Hike

Macomb Mountain is a mountain in the Dix Range of the Adirondacks in the U.S. state of New York. It is the 21st-highest of the Adirondack High Peaks, with an elevation of 4,405 feet (1,343 m), and the most southeasterly of the High Peaks. It is located in the town of North Hudson in Essex County. The mountain is named for Alexander Macomb, an American general who became famous for his victory at the Battle of Plattsburgh in 1814. The name first appeared in print in 1842. The earliest recorded ascent of the mountain was made in 1872 by guide Mel Trumbull and artist Arthur H. Wyant. Major slides on the western face of the mountain were caused by hurricanes in 1947 and 1950 and expanded by Hurricane Irene in 2011.

The summit can be reached by unmarked hiking trails that cross the entire Dix Range, forming a loop. The Hunters Pass Trail begins at the Elk Lake parking lot and continues north for 2.3 miles (3.7 km) to Slide Brook. At the brook, an unmarked trail branches east, following the brook to the base of a large slide on the western face of Macomb Mountain. The summit is at the top of the slide. The unmarked Dix Range Crest Path continues from the summit to South Dix and the other peaks in the Dix Range. The Hunters Pass Trail crosses private land and is closed during the big game hunting season. In the winter, the road to the Elk Lake parking lot is closed, and hikers must begin at the upper parking lot, 2.6 miles (4.2 km) to the south.

== See also ==
- List of mountains in New York
- Northeast 111 4,000-footers
- Adirondack High Peaks
- Adirondack Forty-Sixers
