= South Dix =

Mountain in the United States

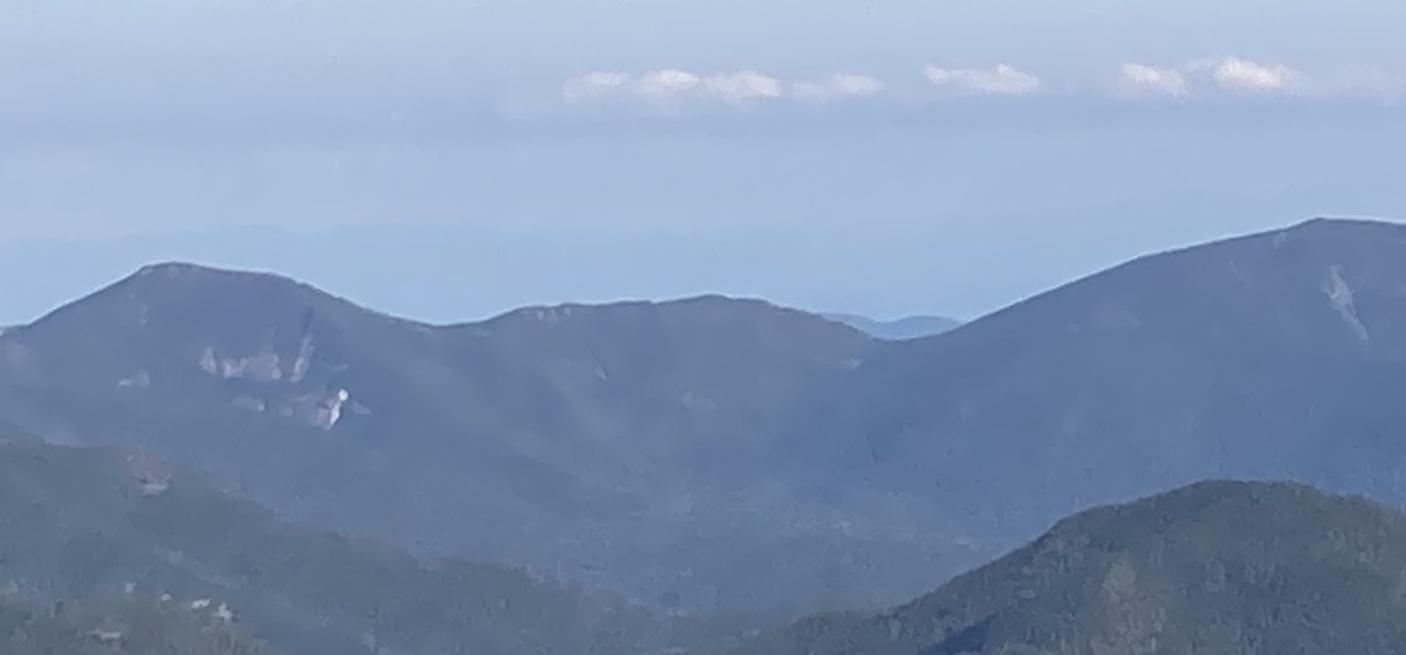
- South Dix (center) photographed from Mount Haystack

Highest point
- Elevation: 4,060 ft (1,240 m) NGVD 29
- Listing: Adirondack High Peaks 37th
- Coordinates: 44°03′36″N 73°46′27″W

Geography
- Location within New York Adirondack Park Location within the United States
- Location: North Hudson, Essex County, New York
- Parent range: Dix Range
- Topo map(s): USGS Mount Marcy, NY

Climbing
- First ascent: 1913, by Samuel R. Lockwood
- Easiest route: Hike

South Dix is a mountain in the Dix Range of the Adirondacks in the U.S. state of New York. It is the 37th-highest of the Adirondack High Peaks, with an elevation of 4,060 feet (1,240 m). It is located in the town of North Hudson in Essex County. The mountain is named after former New York Governor John A. Dix. This name first appeared in print in a 1921 pamphlet by Bob Marshall. The name is being changed to Carson Peak, after Russell M.L. Carson (1884–1961), who popularized the High Peaks with his book, Peaks and People of the Adirondacks. The earliest recorded ascent of the mountain was made in 1913 by Samuel R. Lockwood.

South Dix is flanked to the northeast by Grace Peak (formerly known as East Dix), to the northwest by Hough Peak, and to the southwest by Macomb Mountain. The summit can be reached by unmarked hiking trails that cross the entire Dix Range, forming a loop. The Hunters Pass Trail begins at the Elk Lake parking lot and continues north for 2.3 miles (3.7 km) to Slide Brook. At the brook, an unmarked trail branches east, following the brook to the base of a large slide on the western face of Macomb Mountain. The summit is at the top of the slide. The unmarked Dix Range Crest Path continues from the summit to South Dix and the other peaks in the Dix Range. The Hunters Pass Trail crosses private land and is closed during the big game hunting season. In the winter, the road to the Elk Lake parking lot is closed, and hikers must begin at the upper parking lot, 2.6 miles (4.2 km) to the south.

== See also ==
- List of mountains in New York
- Northeast 111 4,000-footers
- Adirondack High Peaks
- Adirondack Forty-Sixers
