= Grace Hudowalski =

American hiker and co-founder of Adirondack Forty-Sixers

Grace Dolbeck Leach Hudowalski (February 25, 1906 – March 13, 2004) was an American hiker, the first woman (and ninth person overall) to hike all 46 high peaks of the Adirondack Mountains.

== Early life and education ==
She was born in Ticonderoga, New York in 1906, and was the youngest child of James Casper Leach and Alice Luella Dolbeck, and grew up in nearby Minerva.

She hiked her first high peak, Mount Marcy, in 1922, when she was sixteen.

== Later life ==
In 1926, she married Ed Hudowalski, an electrical engineering student at Rensselaer Polytechnic Institute, and they settled near Troy, New York. In 1954, they bought a second home near Schroon Lake.

== Career ==
She worked as the travel promotion supervisor for the New York Commerce Department of Tourism from 1948 until her retirement in 1961.

She finished hiking all 46 Adirondack peaks when she summited Esther Mountain in 1935.

Along with her husband, she co-founded the Forty-Sixers of Troy in 1937, who later became the Adirondack Forty-Sixers in 1948. After serving as president until 1951, she became the club's historian for the next fifty years, and wrote thousands of letters back and forth to other hikers to record their summits and learn about their trips. Many of her letters are currently housed in the New York State Library Manuscripts and Special Collections.

Hudowalski served as executive secretary for the Adirondack North Country Association (now the Adirondack Park Association) for 21 years. An active member of the Adirondack Mountain Club, she was also contributing editor for its publications High Spots and Adirondac, and editor of the Cloud Splitter, a bi-monthly magazine published by the AMC's Albany Chapter. She was also a member of the Outdoor Writers Association of America, and a past president of the New York Folklore Society.

In 1995, she established the Adirondack 46R Conservation Trust, a private endowment to support conservation and educational efforts in the High Peaks Area.

== Legacy ==
In 2004, Hudowalski was awarded the Trail Blazer Award at the Adirondack Mountain Club's annual banquet. She died on March 13, 2004, at age 98.

In 2014, the mountain then known as East Dix was renamed Grace Peak after Hudowalski.

A short documentary on Hudowalski, called The Mountains Will Wait for You, was released in 2013. It was directed by Fredrick Schwoebel and narrated by his father-in-law, Johnny Cash.
