= Blake Peak =

Mountain in the United States

- Location within New York Adirondack Park Location within the United States

Highest point
- Elevation: 3960 NGVD 29
- Prominence: 558 ft (170 m)
- Listing: Adirondack High Peaks 43rd
- Coordinates: 44°04′53″N 73°50′40″W

Geography
- Location: Essex County, New York, U.S.
- Parent range: Colvin Range
- Topo map: USGS Mount Marcy

Climbing
- First ascent: 1874, by Ed Phelps and Miller
- Easiest route: Hike

Blake Peak (or Blake Mountain) is a mountain located in Essex County, New York. The mountain is named after Mills Blake (died 1930), Verplanck Colvin's chief assistant during the Adirondack Survey. It is part of the Colvin Range. Blake Peak is flanked to the northeast by Mount Colvin, and to the southwest by Pinnacle.

The northwest side of Blake Peak drains into the East Branch of the Ausable River, between Upper and Lower Ausable Lakes. The Ausable River drains into Lake Champlain, which in turn drains into Canada's Richelieu River, the Saint Lawrence River, and into the Gulf of Saint Lawrence. The southeast side of Blake Peak drains into the West Inlet of Elk Lake, thence into The Branch of the Schroon River, the Hudson River, and into New York Bay.

Blake Peak was formerly thought to have an elevation of at least 4,000 ft (1,219 m), so it was included on the list of 46 Adirondack High Peaks. More recent surveys show Blake and three other peaks fell slightly short, but they remain on the list.

== See also ==
- List of mountains in New York
- Northeast 111 4000-footers
- Adirondack High Peaks
- Adirondack Forty-Sixers
