= Nippletop =

Mountain in New York, United States

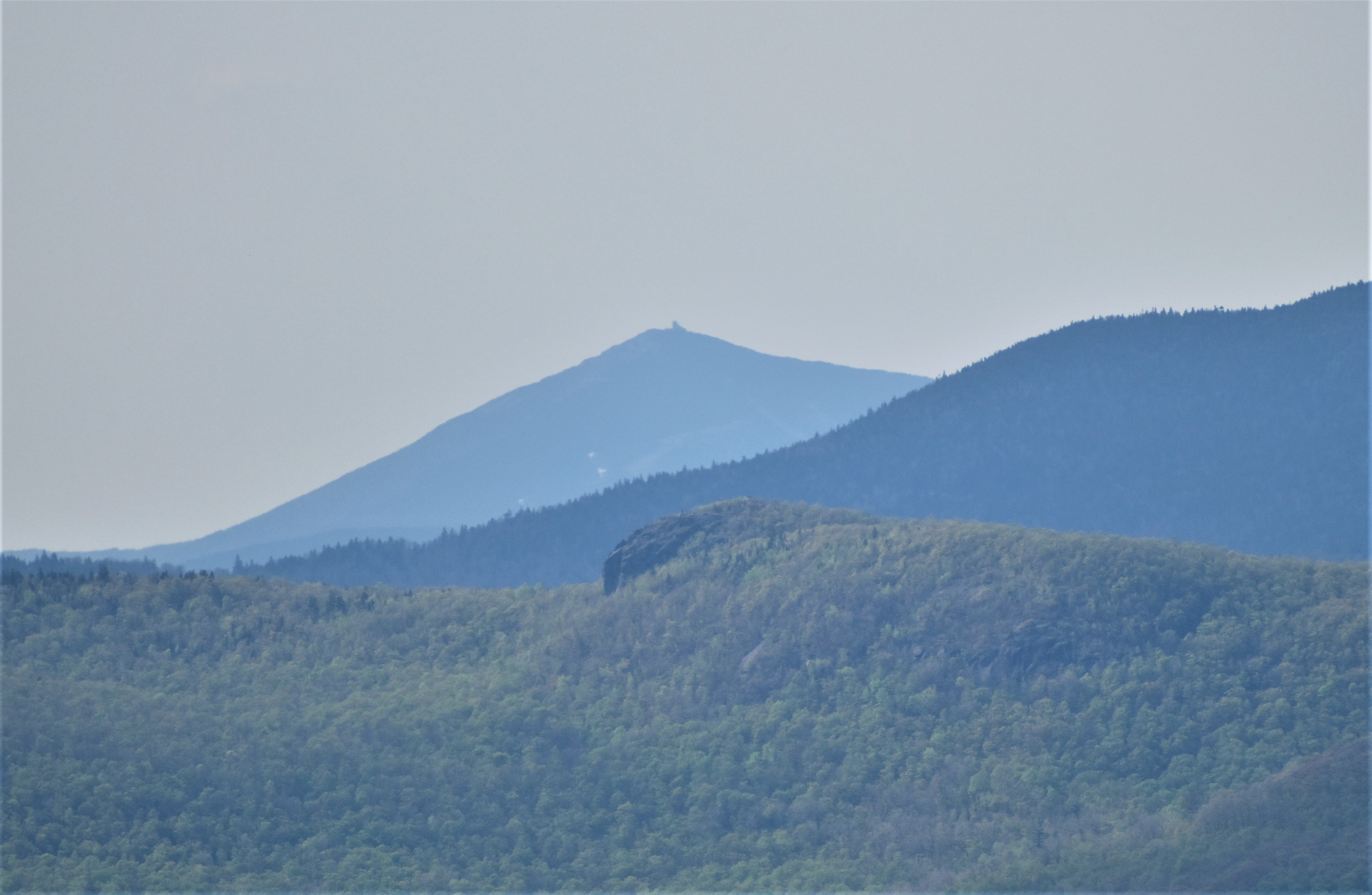
- View of Nippletop from Belfry Mountain in May 2021

Highest point
- Elevation: 4,620 ft (1,410 m) NGVD 29
- Listing: Adirondack High Peaks 13th
- Coordinates: 44°5.35′N 73°48.98′W

Geography
- Location within New York Adirondack Park Location within the United States
- Location: Keene, Essex County, New York, U.S.
- Parent range: Colvin Range
- Topo map: USGS Mount Marcy

Climbing
- First ascent: August 31, 1837, by Ebenezer Emmons and party
- Easiest route: Hike

Nippletop is a mountain in the Colvin Range of the Adirondack Mountains in New York. With an elevation of 4,620 feet (1,410 m), it is the 13th-highest peak in New York and one of the 46 Adirondack High Peaks. It is located near the southern border of the town of Keene in Essex County, in the High Peaks Wilderness Area of Adirondack Park.

Nippletop Mountain, 2,953 feet (900 m) high, is a different mountain located 7 miles (11 km) away at 43°59.54′N 73°45.16′W.

== History ==
The earliest recorded ascent of Nippletop occurred on August 31, 1837, when Ebenezer Emmons and a party of state scientists and guides climbed the mountain. Emmons gave the mountain the name "Dial", but locals referred to it as "Nippletop" after the shape of the summit. The name "Dial" was later reassigned to an adjacent mountain.

== Accessibility ==
The peak can be hiked to by trail starting at the Ausable Club. The route to the summit is a distance of 6.6 miles (10.6 km) with an elevation gain of 2,760 feet (840 m). This hike can be combined with a climb of nearby Dial Mountain and Bear Den Mountain, forming a 14.0 miles (22.5 km) loop.

== See also ==
- List of mountains in New York
- Northeast 111 4,000-footers
- Adirondack High Peaks
- Adirondack Forty-Sixers
- Breast-shaped hill
