= Adirondack High Peaks =

Set of mountain peaks in New York, U.S.

The Adirondack High Peaks are a set of 46 mountain peaks in the Adirondack Mountains of New York state. They have been popular hiking destinations since the late 1920s, when the list of peaks was published in Russell Carson's book Peaks and Peoples of the Adirondacks. Those who have climbed all 46 High Peaks are eligible to join the Adirondack Forty-Sixers club.

== Origin ==
The list of peaks was originally compiled by the mountaineers Herbert Clark, Bob Marshall, and George Marshall, with input from Russell Carson. The Marshall brothers wished to climb every notable peak in the Adirondacks, which they accomplished with Clark between 1918 and 1925. The criteria used were that all peaks should be at least 4,000 feet (1,200 m) in elevation and either have 300 feet (91 m) of prominence or 0.75 miles (1.21 km) of distance from another peak. Several exceptions to these rules were made to include or exclude peaks based on their preferences; Gray Peak, Wright Peak, Armstrong Mountain, Upper Wolfjaw Mountain, and South Dix were included but did not meet either the prominence or distance rule, while Little Marcy, Yard Mountain, and two then-unnamed peaks were excluded despite meeting both. Later surveys revealed that Blake Peak, Cliff Mountain, Couchsachraga Peak, and Nye Mountain are under 4,000 feet in elevation. A survey in the mid-20th century measured the elevation of MacNaughton Mountain as exactly 4,000 feet (1,219 m), but a more recent survey listed the mountain at 3,983 feet (1,214 m). No mountains have been removed or added to the list since the 1920s due to tradition.

== Location ==
All but four of the peaks are located in central and northern Essex County, primarily south of Lake Placid and Keene Valley. The others are just to the west in Franklin County. All of the summits are on land owned by New York State as part of its Forest Preserve. 42 are in a vast tract of nearly 300,000 acres (1,200 km^{2}) known as the High Peaks Wilderness Area, subdivided into central (26 peaks) and outer (16 peaks) zones. Nine of the peaks in the outer zone are in an area formerly known as the Dix Mountain Wilderness Area, which was added to the High Peaks Wilderness in 2018. Giant Mountain and Rocky Peak Ridge are in the adjacent Giant Mountain Wilderness Area. Whiteface Mountain and Esther Mountain are north of Lake Placid in the Wilmington Wild Forest.

=== Mountain ranges ===
There are many mountain ranges within the High Peaks. The Dix Range includes five out of the forty-six High Peaks: Macomb, Grace Peak, South Dix, Hough, and Dix Mountain. The Great Range includes seven out of the forty-six High Peaks: Lower Wolfjaw, Upper Wolfjaw, Armstrong, Gothics, Saddleback, Basin, and Haystack. The Seward Range includes four out of the forty-six High Peaks: Seward, Donaldson, Emmons, and Seymour Mountain. The MacIntyre Range includes four out of the forty-six High Peaks: Mount Marshall, Wright, Algonquin and Iroquois. The Santanoni Range includes three out of the forty-six High Peaks: Santanoni, Panther, and Couchsachraga.

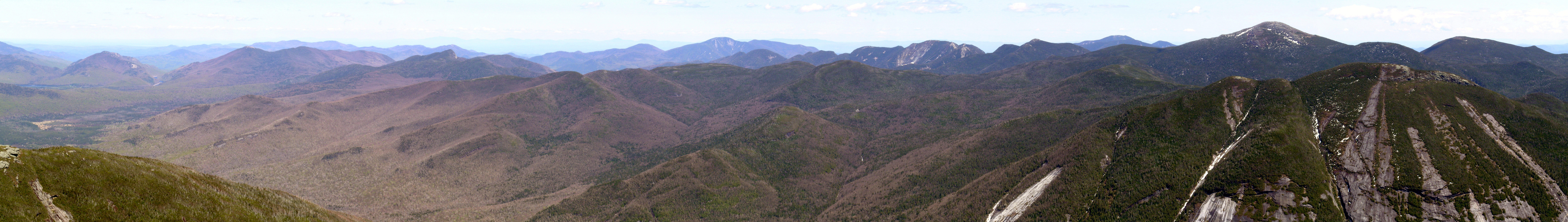
View from Algonquin Peak: (left to right) Pitchoff, Cascade, Porter, Big Slide, Yard, Phelps, Tabletop, Giant, Lower Wolfjaw, Upper Wolfjaw, Armstrong, Gothics, Saddleback, Basin, Nippletop and Dix, Hough, Marcy, Gray, Skylight, and Colden (foreground)

== Ecosystems ==
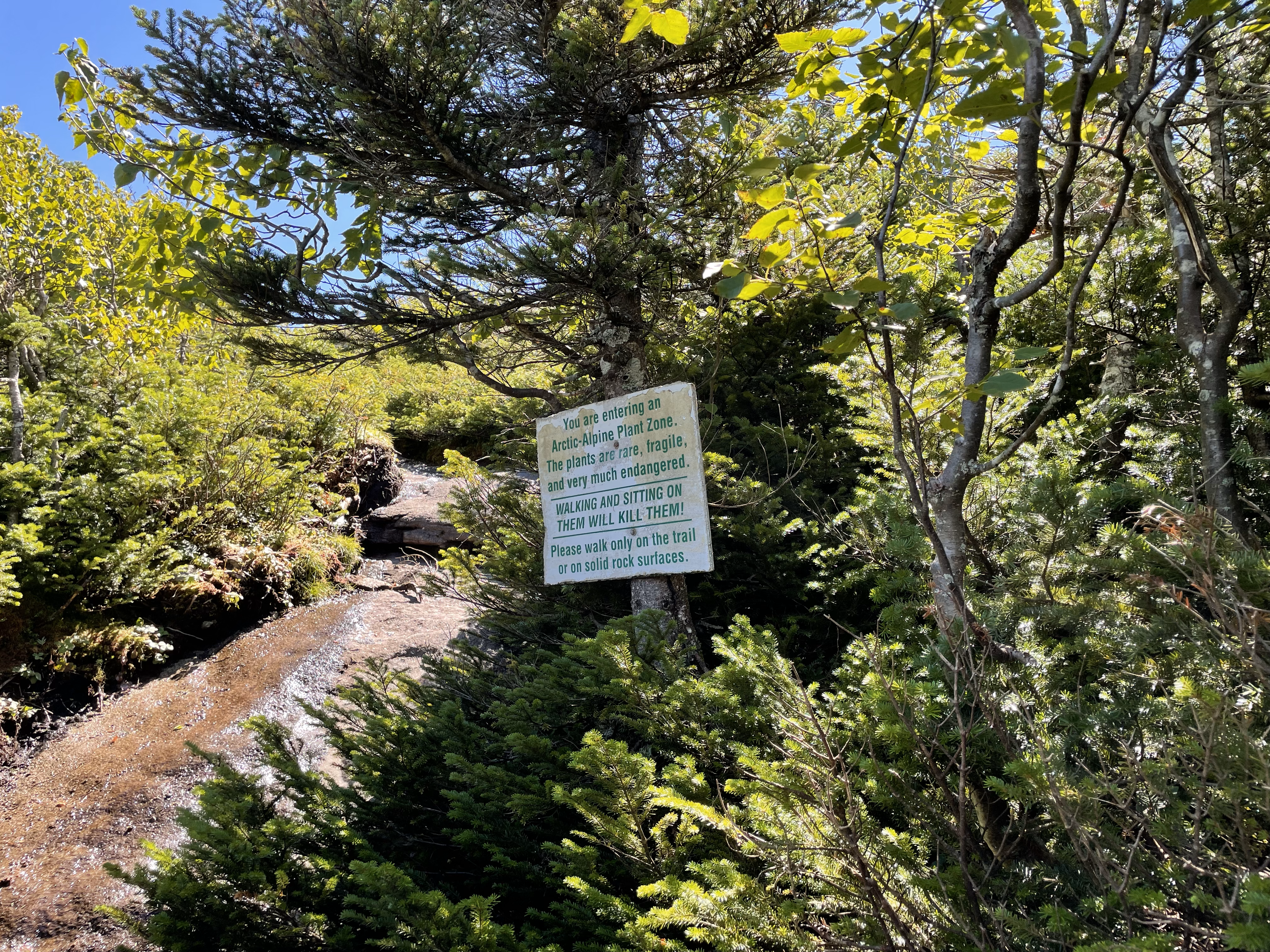
A warning sign for hikers entering the alpine zone of Mount Skylight

The region contains many alpine lakes and meadows, wetlands, streams, and forests. Atop the highest peaks, above the tree line, lies a small alpine ecosystem, a remnant of a larger lowland tundra that retreated uphill following the most recent period of glaciation. The amount of this ecosystem is constantly changing due to variation in the climate from year to year, and has been estimated by different methods to only cover between 65–85 acres (26–34 ha). The alpine ecosystem is considered extremely fragile to damage from hikers, and the Adirondack Mountain Club launched an education campaign to avoid further damage in the 1970s, since which some peaks have seen documented recovery.

The Eastern High Peaks Wilderness area is the most regulated area. Fires are not permitted; dogs must be leashed; overnight groups are limited to eight people and day groups to 15; and bear-resistant food canisters are required from April through November. Camping is prohibited above any elevation greater than 4,000 feet on any of the Adirondack High Peaks.

== Reaching the summits ==
Of the two highest peaks, Algonquin Peak is regarded as a more challenging hike than Mount Marcy. Twenty of the peaks have no official trail to the top, although rough informal routes, commonly referred to as "herd paths," have developed over the years. No true bushwhacking is required on any of the peaks, although some trails are still quite primitive.

The summit of Whiteface Mountain can alternatively be reached by motor vehicle on the Whiteface Mountain Veterans' Memorial Highway. It is not commonly accepted for those who drive to the summit, rather than hike, to join the Adirondack Forty-Sixers.

== The High Peaks ==
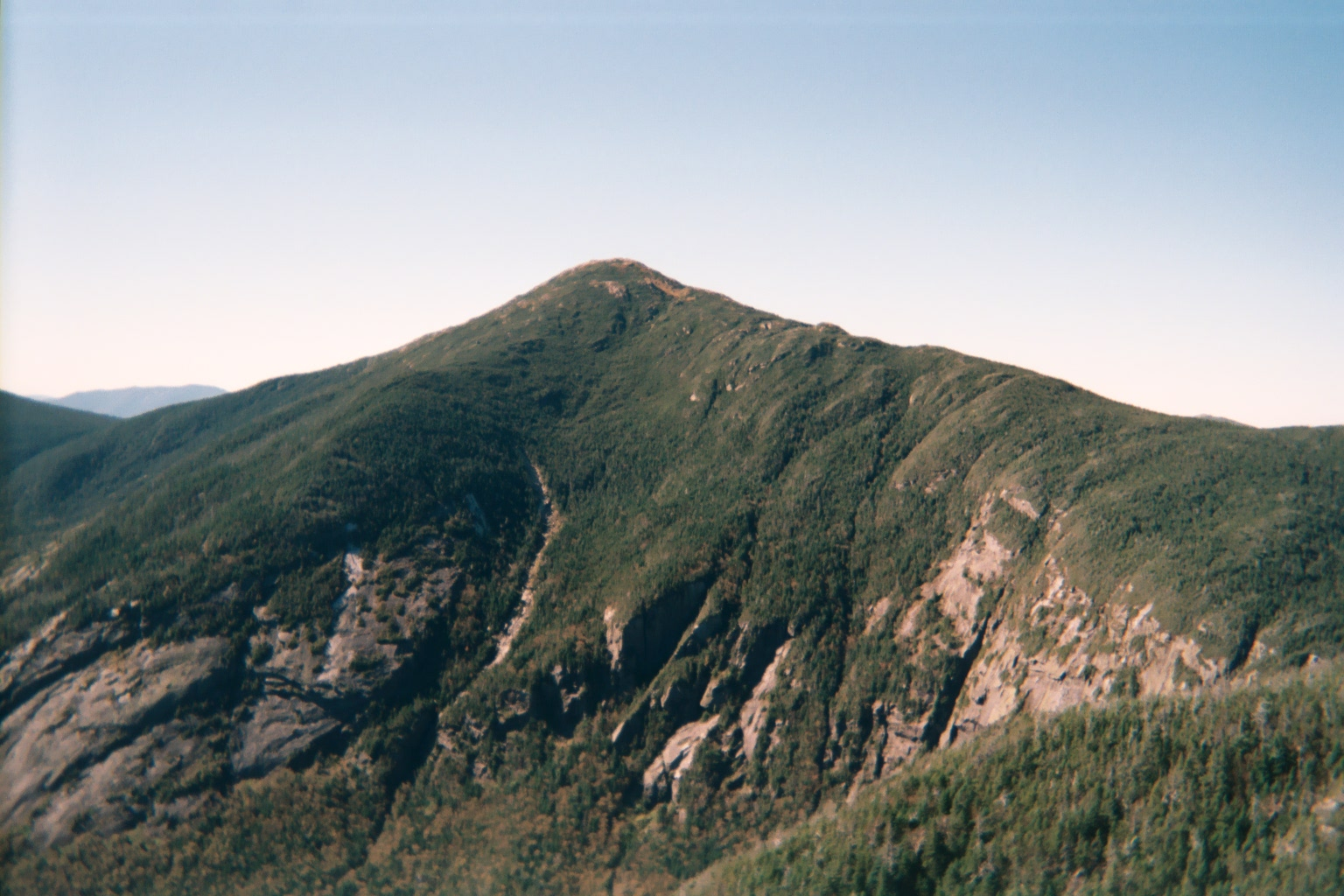
Mount Marcy from Mount Haystack

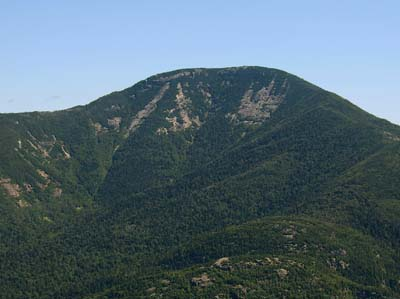
Giant Mountain seen from Noonmark Mountain

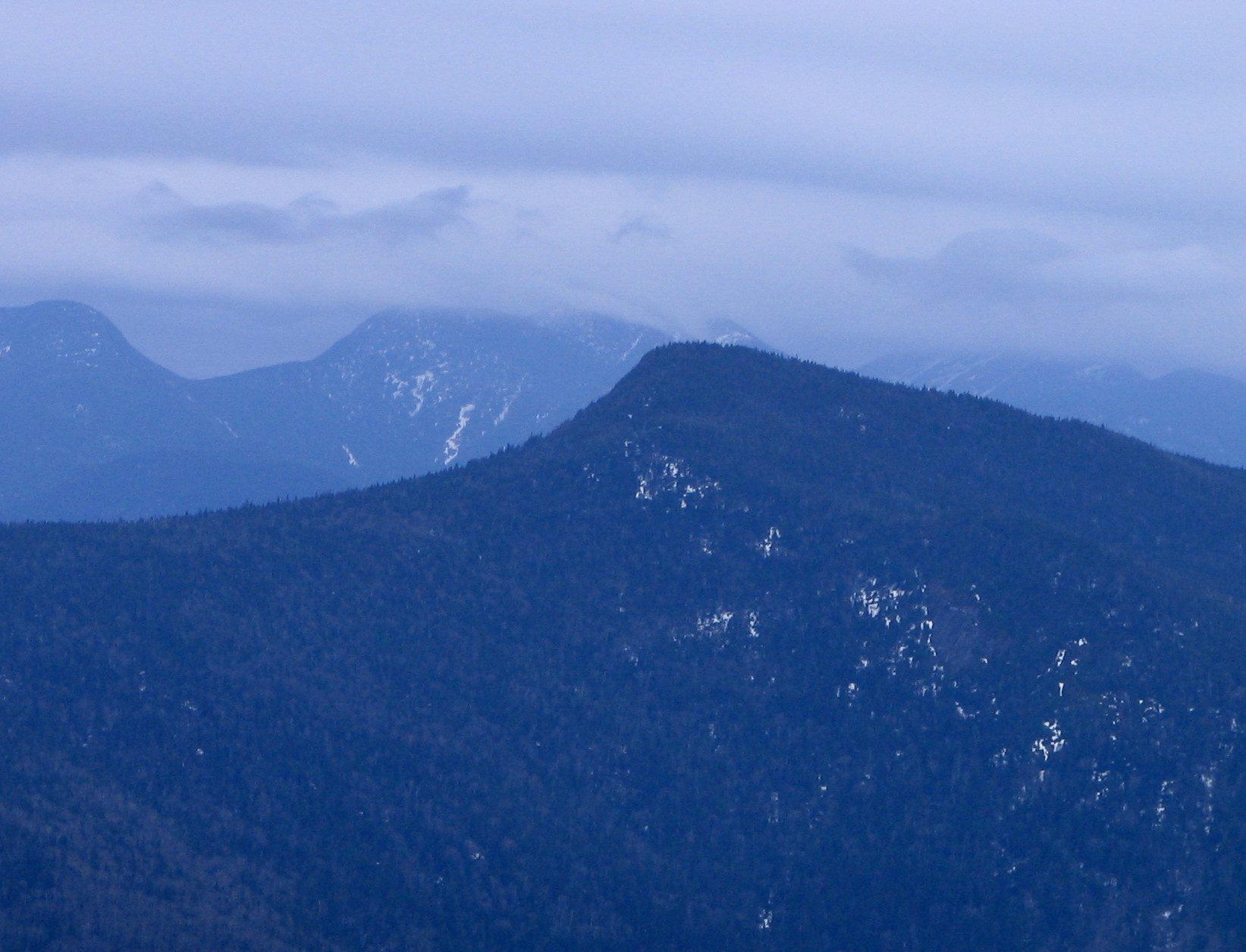
Big Slide Mountain from Cascade Mountain

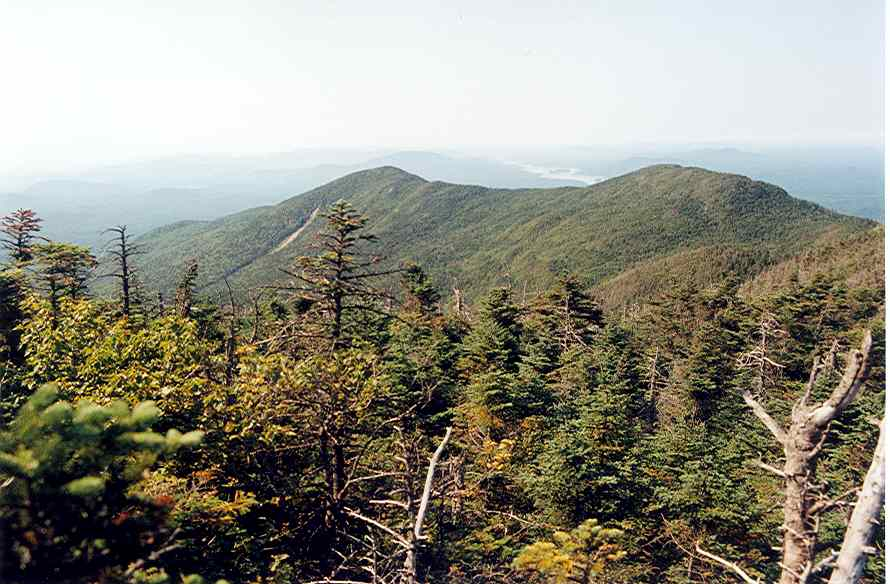
Mount Emmons and Mount Donaldson from Seward

Rank	Mountain	Height	Prominence	Coordinates
1	Mount Marcy	5,344 ft (1,629 m)	4,914 ft (1,498 m)	44.1127°N 73.9237°W
2	Algonquin Peak	5,114 ft (1,559 m)	2,100 ft (640 m)	44.1436°N 73.9867°W
3	Mount Haystack	4,960 ft (1,510 m)	840 ft (260 m)	44.1056°N 73.9006°W
4	Mount Skylight	4,924 ft (1,501 m)	578 ft (176 m)	44.0994°N 73.9308°W
5	Whiteface Mountain	4,867 ft (1,483 m)	3,110 ft (950 m)	44.3658°N 73.9028°W
6	Dix Mountain	4,857 ft (1,480 m)	2,830 ft (860 m)	44.0822°N 73.7864°W
7	Gray Peak	4,840 ft (1,480 m)	102 ft (31 m)	44.1114°N 73.9349°W
8	Iroquois Peak	4,840 ft (1,480 m)	151 ft (46 m)	44.1370°N 73.9982°W
9	Basin Mountain	4,827 ft (1,471 m)	725 ft (221 m)	44.1212°N 73.8863°W
10	Gothics	4,736 ft (1,444 m)	699 ft (213 m)	44.1281°N 73.8571°W
11	Mount Colden	4,714 ft (1,437 m)	876 ft (267 m)	44.1270°N 73.9599°W
12	Giant Mountain	4,627 ft (1,410 m)	2,953 ft (900 m)	44.1611°N 73.7202°W
13	Nippletop	4,620 ft (1,410 m)	1,380 ft (420 m)	44.0892°N 73.8163°W
14	Santanoni Peak	4,607 ft (1,404 m)	2,430 ft (740 m)	44.0825°N 74.1312°W
15	Mount Redfield	4,606 ft (1,404 m)	242 ft (74 m)	44.0948°N 73.9499°W
16	Wright Peak	4,580 ft (1,400 m)	270 ft (82 m)	44.1517°N 73.9803°W
17	Saddleback Mountain	4,515 ft (1,376 m)	380 ft (120 m)	44.1267°N 73.8752°W
18	Panther Peak	4,442 ft (1,354 m)	275 ft (84 m)	44.0984°N 74.1321°W
19	Table Top Mountain	4,427 ft (1,349 m)	430 ft (130 m)	44.1407°N 73.9163°W
20	Rocky Peak Ridge	4,420 ft (1,350 m)	640 ft (200 m)	44.1544°N 73.7056°W
21	Macomb Mountain	4,405 ft (1,343 m)	584 ft (178 m)	44.0517°N 73.7801°W
22	Armstrong Mountain	4,400 ft (1,300 m)	98 ft (30 m)	44.1348°N 73.8490°W
23	Hough Peak	4,400 ft (1,300 m)	374 ft (114 m)	44.0695°N 73.7776°W
24	Seward Mountain	4,361 ft (1,329 m)	2,030 ft (620 m)	44.1597°N 74.1997°W
25	Mount Marshall	4,360 ft (1,330 m)	493 ft (150 m)	44.1275°N 74.0118°W
26	Allen Mountain	4,340 ft (1,320 m)	640 ft (200 m)	44.0708°N 73.9397°W
27	Big Slide Mountain	4,240 ft (1,290 m)	1,049 ft (320 m)	44.1823°N 73.8704°W
28	Esther Mountain	4,240 ft (1,290 m)	302 ft (92 m)	44.3870°N 73.8899°W
29	Upper Wolfjaw Mountain	4,185 ft (1,276 m)	280 ft (85 m)	44.1405°N 73.8453°W
30	Lower Wolfjaw Mountain	4,175 ft (1,273 m)	663 ft (202 m)	44.1484°N 73.8326°W
31	Street Mountain	4,166 ft (1,270 m)	1,280 ft (390 m)	44.1793°N 74.0272°W
32	Phelps Mountain	4,161 ft (1,268 m)	200 ft (61 m)	44.1570°N 73.9215°W
33	Donaldson Mountain	4,140 ft (1,260 m)	138 ft (42 m)	44.1539°N 74.2110°W
34	Seymour Mountain	4,120 ft (1,260 m)	1,020 ft (310 m)	44.1582°N 74.1727°W
35	Sawteeth	4,100 ft (1,200 m)	490 ft (150 m)	44.1133°N 73.8507°W
36	Cascade Mountain	4,098 ft (1,249 m)	1,180 ft (360 m)	44.2186°N 73.8606°W
37	South Dix	4,060 ft (1,240 m)	164 ft (50 m)	44.0600°N 73.7743°W
38	Porter Mountain	4,059 ft (1,237 m)	330 ft (100 m)	44.2153°N 73.8436°W
39	Mount Colvin	4,057 ft (1,237 m)	750 ft (230 m)	44.0939°N 73.8344°W
40	Mount Emmons	4,040 ft (1,230 m)	102 ft (31 m)	44.1437°N 74.2140°W
41	Dial Mountain	4,020 ft (1,230 m)	164 ft (50 m)	44.1059°N 73.7960°W
42	Grace Peak	4,012 ft (1,223 m)	319 ft (97 m)	44.0653°N 73.7574°W
43	Blake Peak	3,960 ft (1,210 m)	558 ft (170 m)	44.0814°N 73.8446°W
44	Cliff Mountain	3,960 ft (1,210 m)	466 ft (142 m)	44.1031°N 73.9751°W
45	Nye Mountain	3,895 ft (1,187 m)	130 ft (40 m)	44.1873°N 74.0238°W
46	Couchsachraga Peak	3,820 ft (1,160 m)	250 ft (76 m)	44.0956°N 74.1602°W

== See also ==
- Adirondack Park
- Catskill High Peaks
- Munro
- 4000 footers
- Northeast 111
- Quebec 1000 meter peaks
