= Cold River (New York) =

River in New York, United States

Coordinates: 44°06′10″N 074°19′11″W

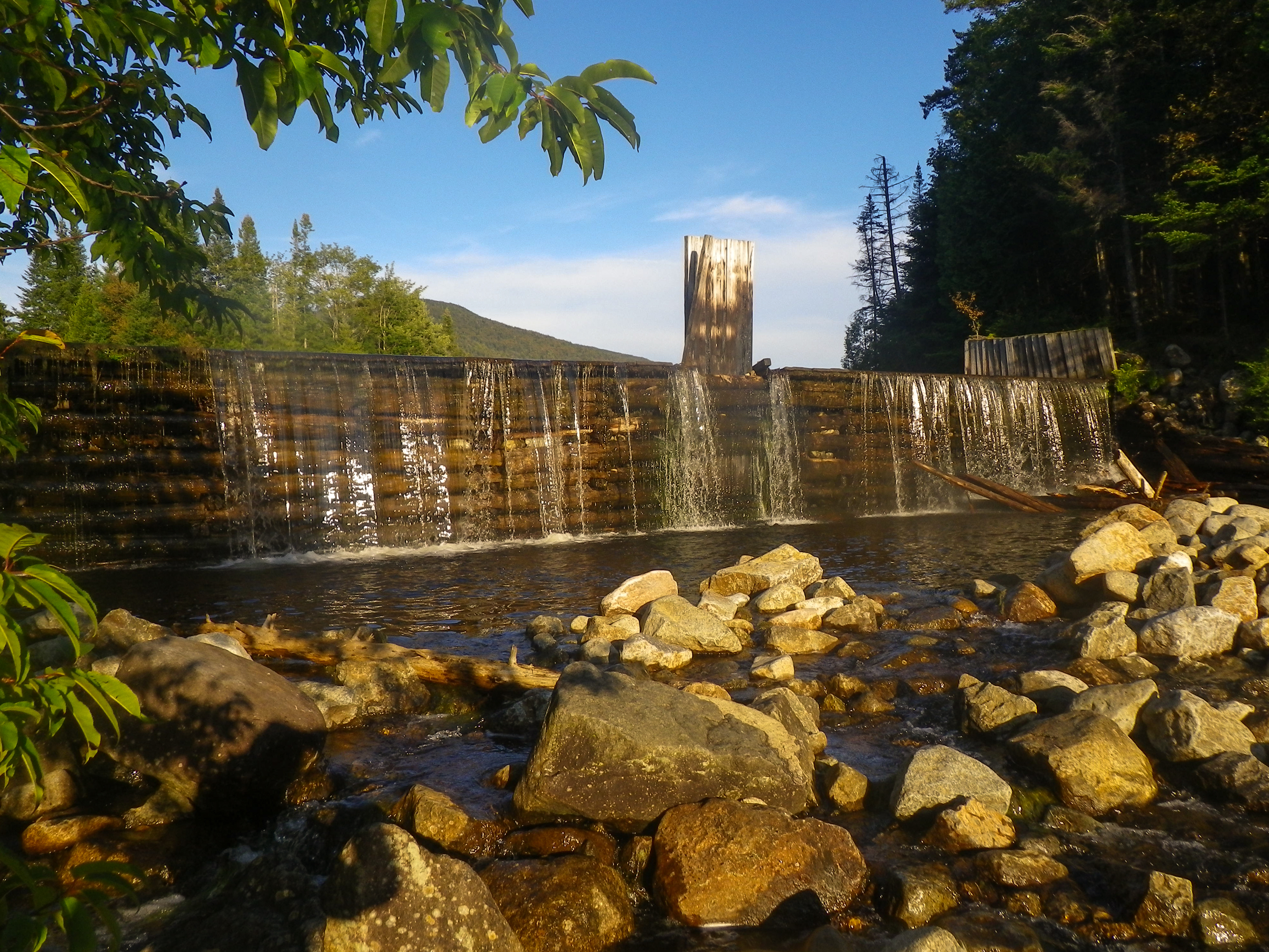
The dam that created Duck Hole, approximately a week before being destroyed by Hurricane Irene

The Cold River is a 14-mile (23 km) river in the Adirondack Mountains in New York, United States. It was one of the first rivers in the state designated as a Wild River, in 1972. The river is located near the conjunction of the county lines of Essex, Franklin and Hamilton Counties (south central Essex, southeastern Franklin, and northeastern Hamilton).

The river ultimately flows into the Raquette River, in a marsh at the north end of Long Lake in the Town of Long Lake.

The area is associated with Noah John Rondeau, a hermit, who lived ten miles up the Cold River for twenty years and termed himself the "Mayor of Cold River City (population 1)". He was, however, a very sociable hermit.

== See also ==
- List of New York rivers
