= High Peaks Wilderness Area =

Wilderness area in New York, United States

- IUCN category Ib (wilderness area)
- Location within the United States
- Location: Adirondack Park New York US
- Nearest city: Keene Valley, NY
- Coordinates: 44.19028°N 74.02690°W
- Area: 275,460 acres (111,470 ha)
- Governing body: New York State Department of Environmental Conservation

The High Peaks Wilderness Area is the largest wilderness area of the Forest Preserve in the U.S. state of New York. It is located in three counties and six towns in the Adirondack Park: Harrietstown in Franklin County, North Elba, Keene, North Hudson and Newcomb in Essex County and Long Lake in Hamilton County.

== Geography ==
It is roughly bounded on the north by NY 3, the old Haybridge Road, which runs from Cold Brook to Averyville, the Adirondak Loj property at Heart Lake, the Mount Van Hoevenberg area and NY 73 near the Cascade Lakes. Private land to the west of Route 73 forms the eastern boundary. The southern boundary is formed by privately owned lands, including the Ausable Club, Finch, Pruyn and Company, National Lead Company and the State University of New York College of Environmental Science and Forestry's Huntington Wildlife Forest. This wilderness is bounded on the west by Long Lake and the Raquette River.

There is one significant inholding: the Johns Brook Lodge, a backcountry cabin and surrounding campsites operated by the Adirondack Mountain Club, 3.5 miles (5.6 km) along the eponymous trail and brook from the popular "Garden" parking area and access point near Keene Valley.

The area includes 112 bodies of water on 1,392 acres (5.6 km^{2}), 238.4 miles (383.5 km) of foot trails, 52.3 miles (84.1 km) of horse trails, and 84 lean-tos. The area contains 42 of the 46 Adirondack High Peaks, including the tallest, Mount Marcy.

The topography ranges from small areas of low-lying swampland (e.g., along the Raquette and Saranac Rivers) to the highest point in New York State at the top of Mount Marcy. Although there is a considerable variety of topography, it is predominantly high mountain country. Like the topography, the forest cover also varies from pole-size hardwoods to mature, large diameter hardwood and softwood stands to the spruce-fir of the subalpine region.

=== Forest ===
Forest fires near the turn of the century were intense enough in some locations, such as the Cascade Range, to destroy both vegetation and topsoil, leaving bare rock which will require many more years for enough soil to develop to support a forest cover. However, the greater part of this area is predominantly forested with mixed hardwoods and softwoods. The higher elevations at and near most mountain tops have thick stands of stunted balsam with some spruce, white birch and yellow birch. The tops of Mount Marcy and Algonquin are above the timberline and a number of other mountain tops are at or close to timberline. The subalpine and alpine vegetation on the tops of these mountains has been of interest to many people, including students of botany, ecology and zoology, as well as recreationists willing to hike to the mountain tops for superb views of the High Peaks region and close observation of unique plant associations.

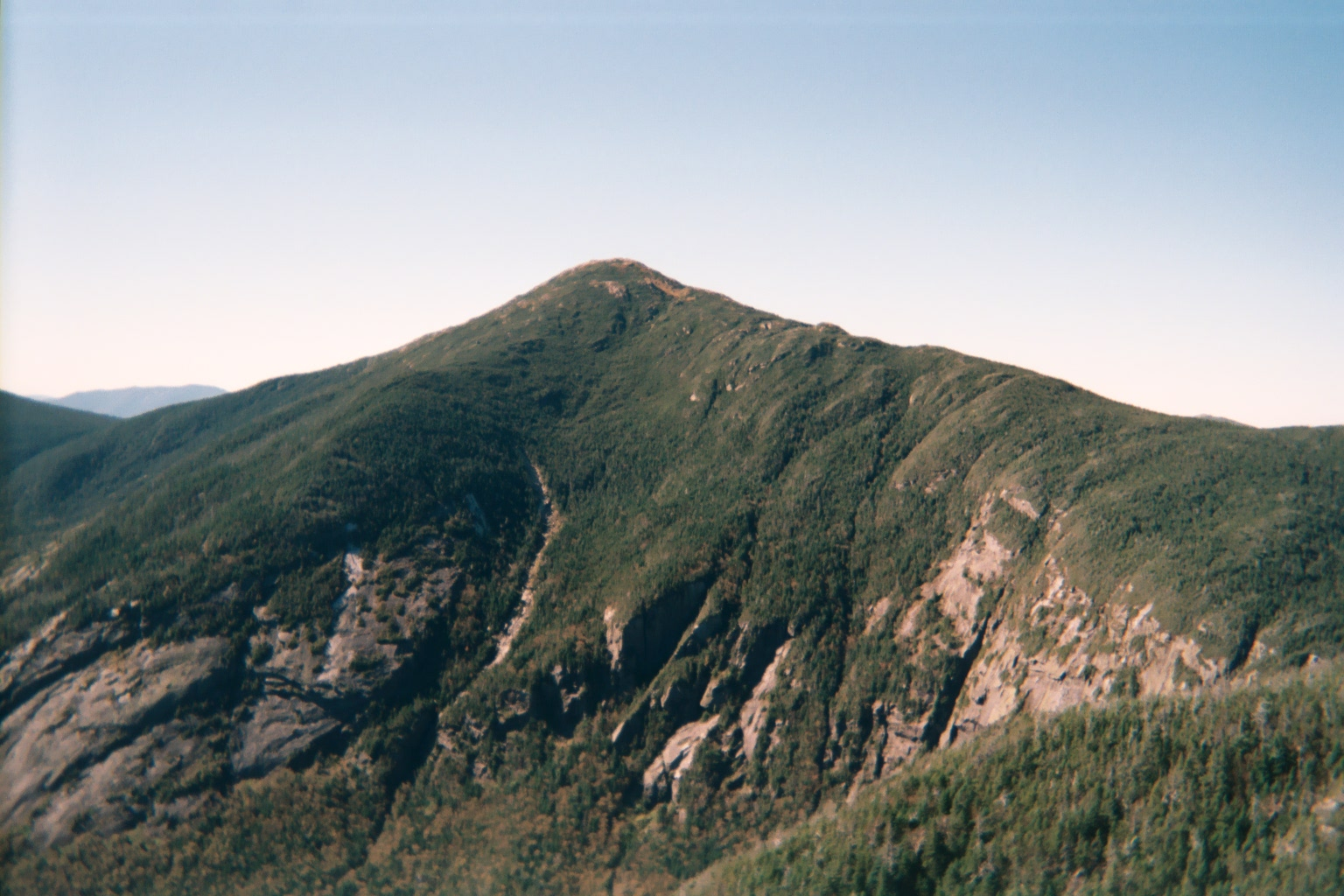
Mount Marcy, the highest point in New York State and most popular hike in the High Peaks Wilderness Area.

=== Water ===
Many streams cascade from the mountain slopes, providing numerous scenic waterfalls, deep pools and brook trout fishing opportunities. Such streams as the Opalescent River, Johns Brook, Klondike Brook, Marcy Brook, Cold River and Moose Creek are frequently photographed. Lake Tear of the Clouds, often considered the source of the Hudson River, lies at about 4,300 feet (1,311 m) elevation on a flank of Mount Marcy.

== Recreation ==
This wilderness area is the most popular destination in the park. In the summer, the area offers numerous opportunities day hiking, backpacking, and rock climbing. The area also offers some opportunities for canoeing. In the winter, the area provides for ice climbing, skiing, snowshoeing, and mountaineering.

Hikers and mountaineers probably outnumber all other groups. Ski touring and snowshoeing throughout the area, particularly the northeast sector, have been on the increase in recent years. Winter mountaineering and winter camping continue to be highly popular.

=== Hiking ===
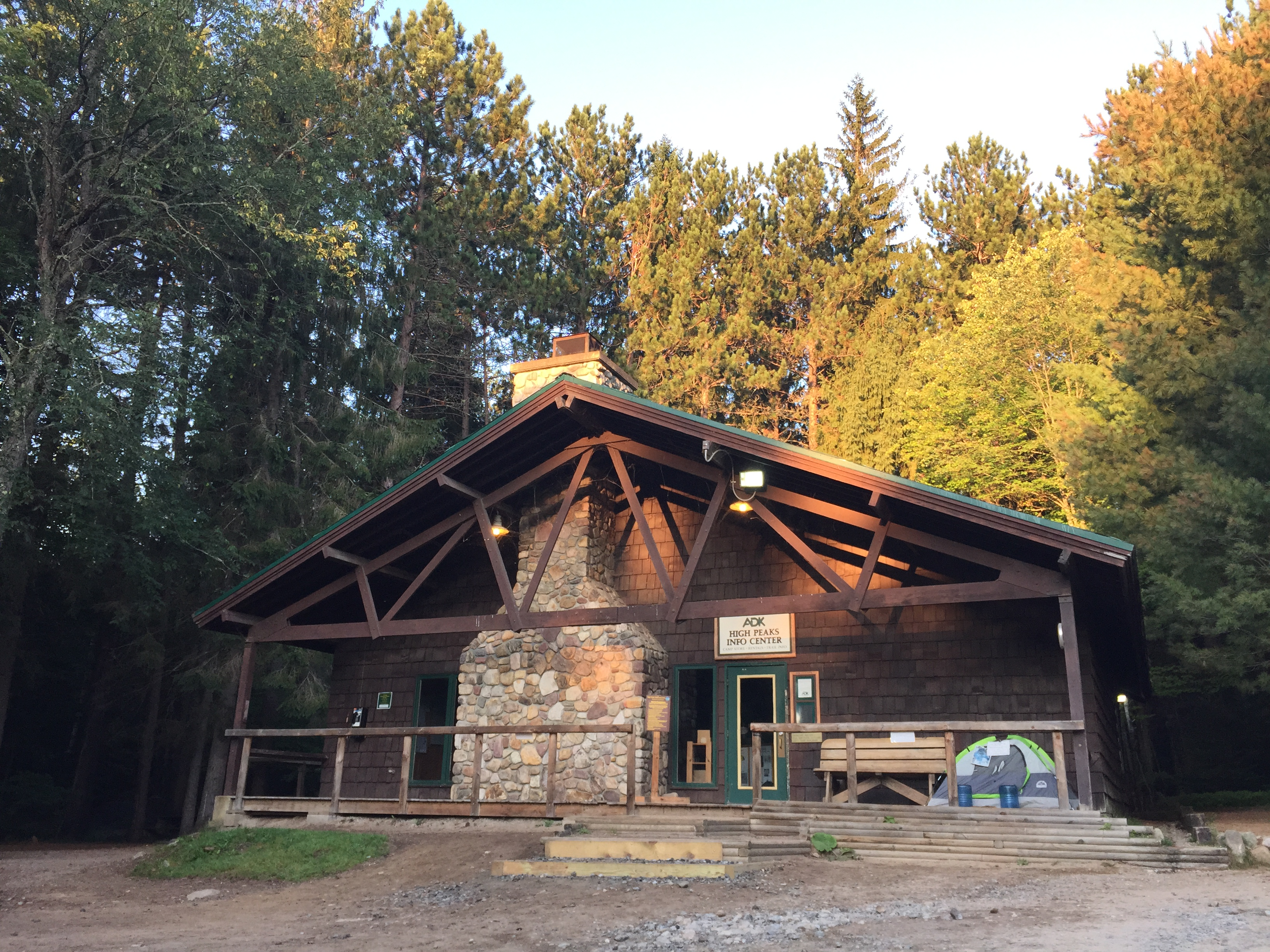
The High Peak Information Center at the end of Adirondack Loj Road in North Elba, Essex County, New York

In addition to hundreds of miles of maintained trails, the area features a number of unmaintained trails, particularly to the summits of high peaks. Hikers may also scramble up the many landslides in the area. Several maintained trails connect with the Adirondack Mountain Reserve and Dix Mountain Wilderness Area, offering opportunities for extended backcountry outings. The 138-mile (222 km) Northville-Placid Trail crosses the High Peaks Wilderness Area from its southeastern corner at Long Lake to Lake Placid.

The range trail, which traverses a series of mountain summits known as the Great Range from Mount Marcy to Keene Valley, is considered by many to be the most scenic and rugged trail in the state. This trail traverses eight of the mountain peaks in this area that exceed 4,000 feet (1,219 m) in elevation. The western portions of the area receive substantially less public use than the Mount Marcy region.

Wanika Falls, Indian Falls, Indian Pass, the Duck Hole, Avalanche Pass, and Panther Gorge, are also popular hiking destinations.

=== Climbing ===
The area contains many cliffs that are popular for rock climbing, including Cascade Lakes, Wallface Mountain, and Avalanche Pass. In the winter, Avalanche Pass and the trap dike on Mount Colden are popular destinations.

=== Skiing ===
Many trails are suitable for cross-country skiing and numerous rock slides offer backcountry opportunities for alpine and telemark skiing as well as snowboarding. Avalanches occur in this region, requiring winter visitors to take appropriate precautions.

=== Canoeing ===
The Adirondack Canoe Route, which runs ninety miles from Old Forge to Saranac Lake, parallels the western boundary of the Wilderness Area for 23 miles (37 km) along the eastern shores of Long Lake and the Raquette River; this section of the Canoe Route forms a part of the HPWA. Although the generally steep terrain limits access to most water features within the HPWA, the Cascade Lakes, Henderson Lake, and the Cold River are popular destinations at the edge of the wilderness. It is possible to access the Preston Ponds and Duck Hole by a long carry from Henderson Lake.

=== Special regulations ===
Heavy use at the end of the 20th century led New York's Department of Environmental Conservation, which manages the area, to adopt the tightest rules and regulations for any of its properties in the Forest Preserve. Administratively, the area is subdivided into an eastern and western zone. In the more frequented former, backpackers are limited in group size. Dogs must be kept on a leash at all times. As of 2005, the DEC has regulated that all overnight campers must carry a bear canister for their food. Also a permit is required for camping on the shorelines of the Essex Chain of Lakes. Furthermore, no fires are allowed in the Eastern High Peaks region.

== Public access ==
Road access is possible from all sides of the wilderness area. It is possible to reach the western portion by canoe or kayak from Long Lake and the Cold River.

== See also ==
- List of Wilderness Areas in the Adirondack Park
