= George Marshall (conservationist) =

American economist, political activist and conservationist

George Marshall (February 11, 1904 – May 15, 2000) was an American economist, political activist, and conservationist. He was an early leader of The Wilderness Society, a HUAC abolitionist, and later a leader of the Sierra Club.

== Early life and education ==
George Marshall was the son of Louis Marshall, noted constitutional lawyer, supporter of the Jewish Agency for Palestine, and co-founder of the American Jewish Committee, and Florence Lowenstein. George grew up in Manhattan, New York with his sister Ruth and brothers James and Robert AKA Bob. All four children attended Felix Adler's Ethical Culture School. Marshall continued his education at Columbia University, where he earned bachelor's (1926) and Master's (1927) degrees. He later earned a PhD in economics from the Brookings Institution in 1930. His doctoral dissertation was entitled "The Machinists' Union: A Study in Institutional Development".

== Career ==
From 1934-37, Marshall worked as an economist for the consumer division of the National Recovery Administration under Franklin D. Roosevelt's New Deal.

=== Political activist ===
Marshall served as chairman of the National Federation for Constitutional Liberties and the Civil Rights Congress, a leftist organization that provided funding and leadership in the early United States civil rights movement. In the late 1940s and early 1950s, he worked with Paul Robeson, Dashiell Hammett, and William L. Patterson on litigation protecting the rights of African-Americans and American communists. Marshall was called before the House Committee on Un-American Activities, where he was cited for Contempt of Congress for refusing to turn over records from the National Federation. Convicted, he served three months in a federal prison in 1950.

=== Conservationist ===
Marshall had a lifelong dedication to conservationism. He spent his childhood summers at Knollwood, his father's Great Camp on the shores of Lower Saranac Lake; with his brother Bob Marshall he climbed all 46 Adirondack High Peaks (mountains taller than 4,000 feet), an accomplishment that made him a founding "46er".

In 1939, after his brother's death at age 38, Marshall became a trustee of the Robert Marshall Wilderness Fund, now known as the Bob Marshall Wilderness Foundation, which supported conservation activities, especially The Wilderness Society, founded by his brother.

George Marshall made major contributions to The Wilderness Society and then the Sierra Club for more than 50 years. Marshall served on the board of directors of the Sierra Club from 1959–68, and later as "director, president, and vice chairman".

== Personal life and death ==
Marshall married Elizabeth Dublin; they had two children, Roger Marshall and Nancy Marshall Schultz.

Marshall moved to London until late in his life. He returned to New York in 1993, following the death of his wife.

George Marshall died at age 96 on May 21, 2000, in Nyack, NY.

== Works ==
Marshall edited The Wilderness Society's magazine, The Living Wilderness from 1957–61.

Another of George Marshall's contributions was to edit his brother Bob's notebooks on the Alaskan wilderness, published as Alaska Wilderness: Exploring the Central Brooks Range, now in its third edition.

- Alaska Wilderness: Exploring the Central Brooks Range by Robert Marshall, edited by George Marshall (1956)
