= North Hudson, New York =

- Town
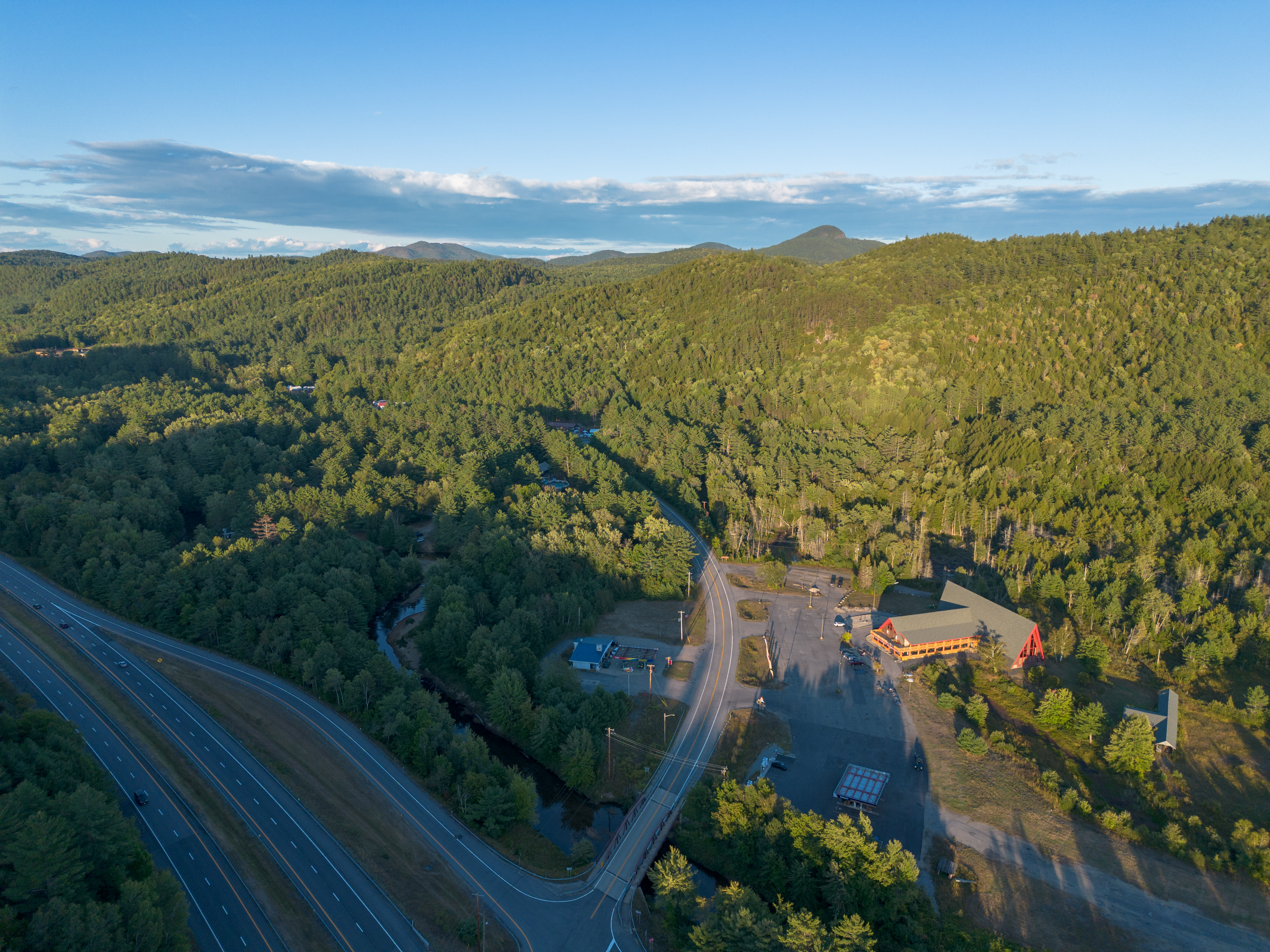
- North Hudson in 2025
- Motto: "The Hub of the Adirondacks"
- Location in Essex County and the state of New York
- Coordinates: 43°59′47″N 73°43′17″W
- Country: United States
- State: New York
- County: Essex

Government
  - Type: Town Council
  - Town Supervisor: Cassandra D'Agostino
  - Town Council: Members' List: • Marshall Gero; • Robert Dobie; • Maureen Marsden; • Brian Caza

Area
  - Total: 184.67 sq mi (478.29 km^{2})
  - Land: 181.45 sq mi (469.96 km^{2})
  - Water: 3.22 sq mi (8.33 km^{2})
- Elevation: 1,549 ft (472 m)

Population (2020)
  - Total: 250
  - Density: 1.3/sq mi (0.52/km^{2})
- Time zone: UTC-5 (Eastern (EST))
  - Summer (DST): UTC-4 (EDT)
- ZIP Codes: 12855 (North Hudson); 12964 (New Russia)
- Area code: 518
- FIPS code: 36-031-53077
- GNIS feature ID: 0979290
- Website: www.townofnorthhudsonny.gov

North Hudson is a town in Essex County, New York, United States. The population was 240 at the 2010 census. The town derives its name by being near the northern end of the Hudson River.

The town is in the south-central part of the county and is south of Plattsburgh. North Hudson is within the Adirondack Park.

== History ==
The region was first settled circa 1800. Early pioneers chose the southeastern part of the town.

The town was formed in 1848 from the town of Moriah. Early industry was based on tanning, owing to the presence of hemlock bark from the forests. Later, the trees were harvested for wood pulp.

By the end of the 19th century, the tourist trade began to predominate, especially at Underwood and Elk Lake. The theme park Frontier Town, a Wild West themed family tourist attraction, operated here from 1952 to 1998. The closure of Frontier Town had a severe negative impact on the town's economy. In 2018, Frontier Town reopened as Adirondack campground and day-use area.

== Geography ==
According to the United States Census Bureau, the town has a total area of 184.7 square miles (478.3 km^{2}), of which 181.5 square miles (470.0 km^{2}) is land and 3.2 square miles (8.3 km^{2}), or 1.74%, is water.

Two branches of the Schroon River, a south-flowing tributary of the Hudson River, arise in North Hudson.

The Adirondack Northway (Interstate 87) and U.S. 9 traverse the town as north-south highways. I-87 Exits 29 (North Hudson hamlet) and 30 (US-9) are within the town.

== Climate ==
Climate data for North Hudson, New York
Month	Jan	Feb	Mar	Apr	May	Jun	Jul	Aug	Sep	Oct	Nov	Dec	Year
Mean daily maximum °F (°C)	31.0 (−0.6)	34.0 (1.1)	43.0 (6.1)	56.0 (13.3)	70.0 (21.1)	77.0 (25.0)	83.0 (28.3)	81.0 (27.2)	74.0 (23.3)	59.0 (15.0)	47.0 (8.3)	35.0 (1.7)	57.5 (14.2)
Mean daily minimum °F (°C)	10.0 (−12.2)	11.0 (−11.7)	19.0 (−7.2)	32.0 (0.0)	44.0 (6.7)	54.0 (12.2)	58.0 (14.4)	57.0 (13.9)	49.0 (9.4)	39.0 (3.9)	28.0 (−2.2)	18.0 (−7.8)	34.9 (1.6)
Average precipitation inches (mm)	2.3 (58)	2.3 (58)	2.7 (69)	2.9 (74)	3.5 (89)	3.9 (99)	3.4 (86)	3.8 (97)	3.4 (86)	3.4 (86)	3.1 (79)	2.8 (71)	37.5 (952)
Average snowfall inches (cm)	15.6 (40)	14.9 (38)	13.0 (33)	3.4 (8.6)	0.1 (0.25)	0.0 (0.0)	0.0 (0.0)	0.0 (0.0)	0.0 (0.0)	0.4 (1.0)	4.5 (11)	15.2 (39)	67.1 (170.85)
Average precipitation days	7.0	6.0	7.0	8.0	9.0	10.0	9.0	8.0	7.0	8.0	7.0	7.0	93
Average snowy days	6.0	5.0	4.0	1.0	0.0	0.0	0.0	0.0	0.0	0.0	1.0	6.0	23
Mean daily daylight hours	9.5	10.5	12.0	13.5	14.5	15.5	15.0	14.0	12.5	11.0	9.5	9.0	12.2

== Demographics ==
Historical population
Census	Pop.	Note	%±
1850	561		—
1860	297		−47.1%
1870	738		148.5%
1880	693		−6.1%
1890	656		−5.3%
1900	544		−17.1%
1910	434		−20.2%
1920	397		−8.5%
1930	235		−40.8%
1940	244		3.8%
1950	258		5.7%
1960	220		−14.7%
1970	212		−3.6%
1980	179		−15.6%
1990	266		48.6%
2000	266		0.0%
2010	240		−9.8%
2020	250		4.2%
U.S. Decennial Census

As of the census of 2000, there were 266 people, 114 households, and 76 families residing in the town. The population density was 1.5 inhabitants per square mile (0.58/km^{2}). There were 279 housing units, at an average density of 1.5 per square mile (0.58/km^{2}). The racial makeup of the town was 94.74% White, 1.13% Native American, 0.38% Asian, and 3.76% from two or more races.

There were 114 households, of which 27.2% had children under the age of 18 living with them, 55.3% were married couples living together, 6.1% had a female householder with no husband present, and 32.5% were nonfamilies. 28.1% of all households were made up of individuals, and 11.4% had someone living alone who was 65 years of age or older. The average household size was 2.33 and the average family size was 2.88.

In the town, the population was spread out, with 24.4% under the age of 18, 7.1% from 18 to 24, 22.6% from 25 to 44, 28.6% from 45 to 64, and 17.3% who were 65 years of age or older. The median age was 41 years. For every 100 females, there were 101.5 males. For every 100 females age 18 and over, there were 95.1 males.

The median income for a household in the town was $28,977, and the median family income was $40,833. Males had a median income of $36,250 versus $20,833 for females. The per capita income for the town was $16,075. About 9.7% of families and 10.1% of the population were below the poverty line, including 6.0% of those under the age of eighteen and 10.5% of those 65 or over.

== Communities and locations in North Hudson ==
- Blue Ridge — A location west of North Hudson hamlet, on County Road 84.
- Boreas Ponds — A lake near the western town line.
- Deadwater — A former community in the town, named after an iron works.
- Elk Lake — A lake in the northwestern part of the town, on U.S. 9 and the Northway.
- North Hudson — The hamlet of North Hudson is situated in the southeastern section of the town by the Schroon River at the Northway and U.S. 9.
- Underwood — A hamlet in the northeastern part of the town located along U.S. 9, just south of I-87 Interchange 30.
