= Northeast 111 =

List of US peaks used by peak-baggers

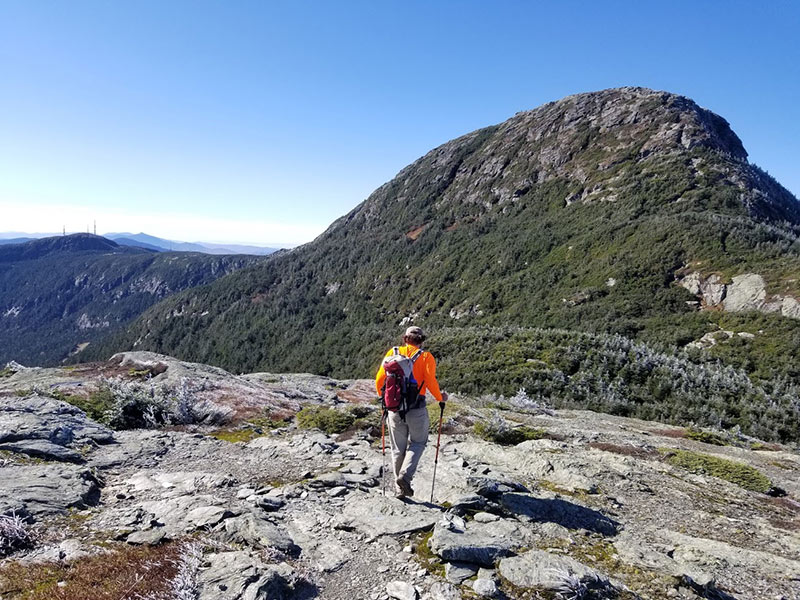
- The summit of Mount Mansfield, the tallest peak in Vermont and the 44th tallest mountain on the Northeast 111

Highest point
- Peak: Mount Washington
- Elevation: 6,288 ft (1,917 m)
- Coordinates: 44°16′13.8″N 71°18′11.7″W

Geography
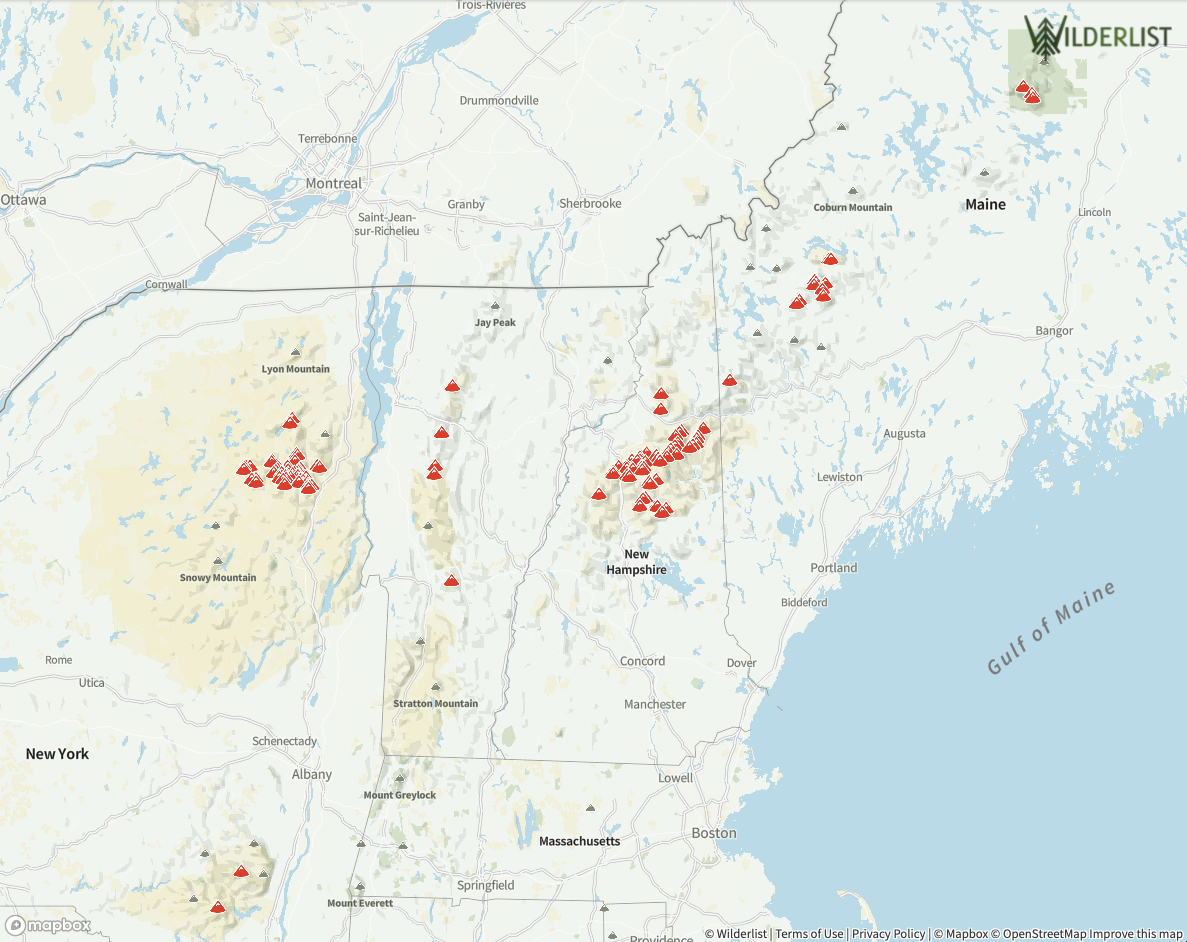
- Map of the 115 peaks (in red) of the Northeast 111
- Country: United States
- Region: Northeast

The Northeast 111 is a peak-bagging list of 4,000-foot (1,219.2 m) mountains in the northeastern states of the United States. It includes the sixty-seven 4000-footers of New England (48 in New Hampshire, 14 in Maine and 5 in Vermont), the 46 Adirondack High Peaks, and Slide and Hunter Mountain, both in the Catskills of New York. The list was first compiled in 1971.

This list includes 115 peaks but is still referred to as the "Northeast 111" because that name predates the additions of Galehead Mountain and Bondcliff in New Hampshire, as well as Mount Redington and Spaulding Mountain in Maine, due to later surveys determining they do indeed rise to 4,000 feet (1,219.2 m) and satisfy topographic prominence requirements. There are also four peaks in the Adirondacks that are under 4,000 feet, (Blake Peak, Cliff Mountain, Couchsachraga Peak, and Nye Mountain) making the true number of 4,000 foot peaks 111.

== See also ==
- New England Four-thousand footers
- Adirondack High Peaks
- Catskill Mountain 3500 Club
- Quebec 1000 meter peaks
