= Mount Colvin =

Mountain in New York, United States

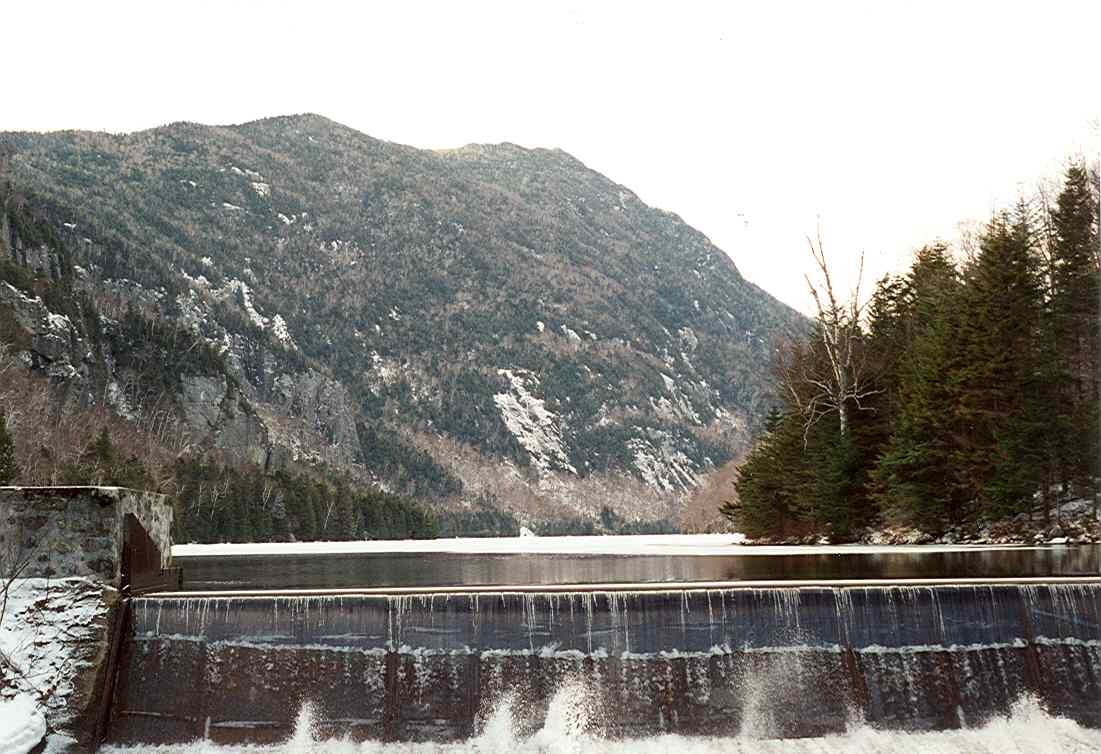
- Mt. Colvin seen from Lower Ausable Lake

Highest point
- Elevation: 4,057 ft (1,237 m) NGVD 29
- Listing: Adirondack High Peaks 39th
- Coordinates: 44°05′38″N 73°50′04″W

Geography
- Location within New York Adirondack Park Location within the United States
- Location: Keene, New York, U.S.
- Parent range: Adirondacks
- Topo map: USGS Mount Marcy

Climbing
- First ascent: August 20, 1873, by Verplanck Colvin, Mills Blake, Charles H. Peck, Orson Schofield Phelps, Eli Chase, and Henry Reed
- Easiest route: Hike

Mount Colvin is the 39th highest peak in the High Peaks Region of the Adirondack Mountains in the U.S. State of New York. Mount Colvin offers excellent views of a number of other Adirondack High Peaks, most notably the peaks that comprise the Great Range. High Peaks that are readily visible from Colvin include Giant, Rocky Peak Ridge, Upper Wolfjaw, Lower Wolfjaw, Armstrong, Sawteeth, Gothics, Saddleback, Basin, Tabletop, Marcy, Haystack, Redfield, Allen, Nippletop, Dial and Blake.

The mountain is named after Verplanck Colvin, an explorer of the Adirondacks and the director of the survey which mapped the region. Originally named Mount Sabele and unknown to Colvin, he deferred to a survey team member to name it. The member chose Mount Colvin to honor his leader.
