= Ausable Club =

Historic club in New York, United States

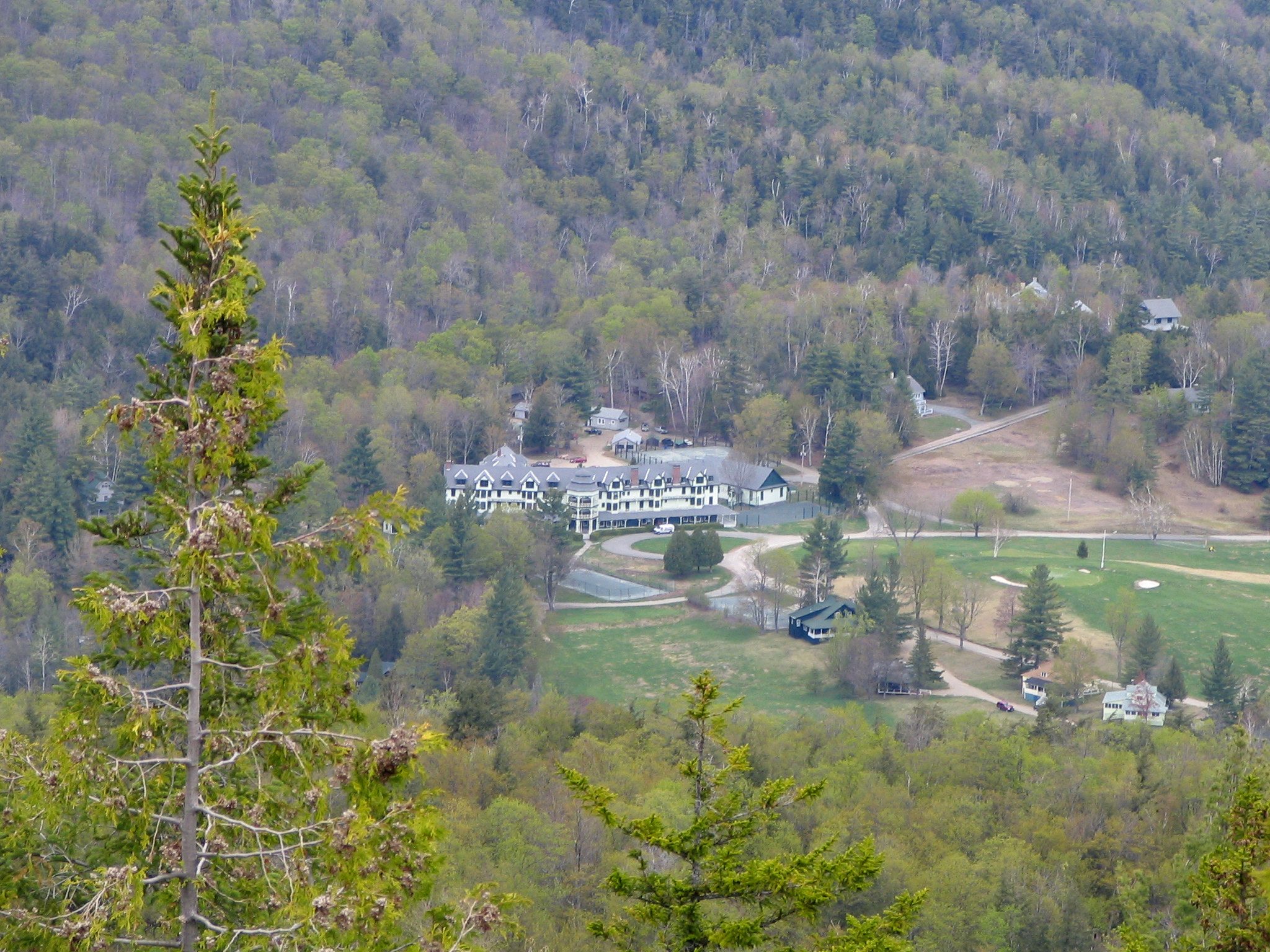
- The clubhouse from Noonmark Mountain in 2008

General information
- Architectural style: Queen Anne, Stick/Eastlake
- Location: 137 Ausable Road, St. Huberts, New York
- Coordinates: 44°9′7″N 73°46′51″W
- Year built: 1890

Technical details
- Size: 7 acres (28,000 m^{2})

Design and construction
- Architect: Wilson Brothers & Company

Website
- ausableclub.org

U.S. National Register of Historic Places
- Designated: July 6, 2005
- Reference no.: 05000683
- Boundary increase: February 20, 2025
- Boundary increase reference number: 100011461

The Ausable Club, in St. Huberts, New York, is the name of a club and the clubhouse of the Adirondack Mountain Reserve (AMR), which upon the initiative of William George Neilson of Philadelphia, formed in 1887 to save the lands around Beede's Hotel from the lumber industry. The Reserve once owned most of the Adirondack High Peaks. The club is also the home of the Adirondack Trail Improvement Society, known as A.T.I.S, which developed and still maintains many of the trails to the high peaks. The clubhouse property, also known as St. Hubert's Inn, Beede House, or other Keene Heights Hotel Company, is listed on the National Register of Historic Places.

Club members have included Harvard president James Conant, clergyman Henry Sloane Coffin, aeronautical engineer Jerome Hunsaker, painter Harold Weston, American statesman John J. McCloy and US Secretary of War Henry L. Stimson, who blazed a trail up nearby Noonmark Mountain that is still in use. Certain Easement Trails on AMR/AC lands are open to the public, with restrictions, and provide access to many of the High peaks trails: Basin Mountain, Mount Skylight, Mount Marcy, Mount Haystack, Mount Colvin, Nippletop Mountain, Dial Mountain, Lower Wolfjaw Mountain, Upper Wolfjaw Mountain, Armstrong Mountain, Gothics, Sawteeth, Saddleback Mountain, Noonmark Mountain, Round Mountain, and Rainbow and Beaver Meadow Falls.

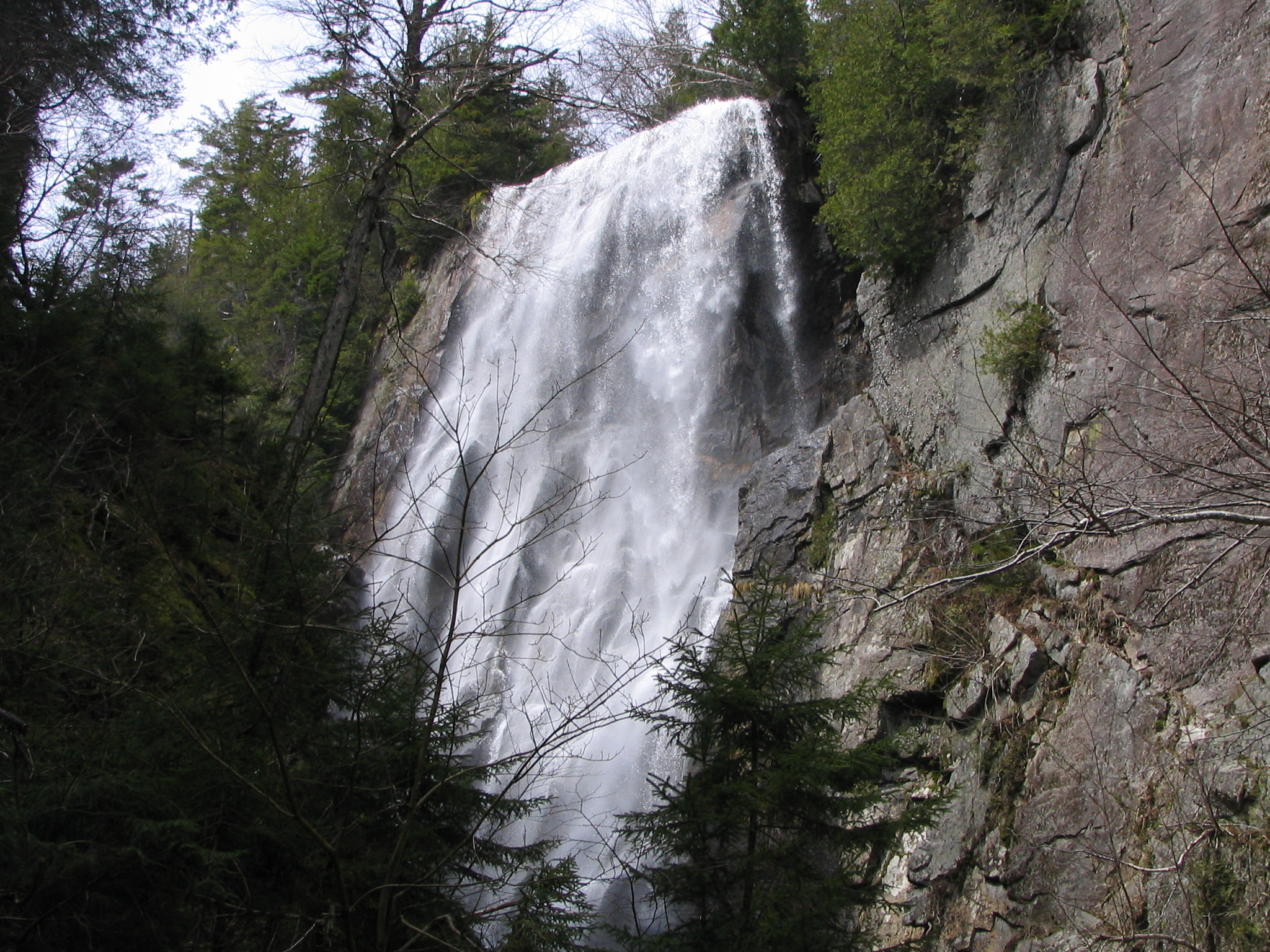
Rainbow Falls, West River Trail, on AMR lands

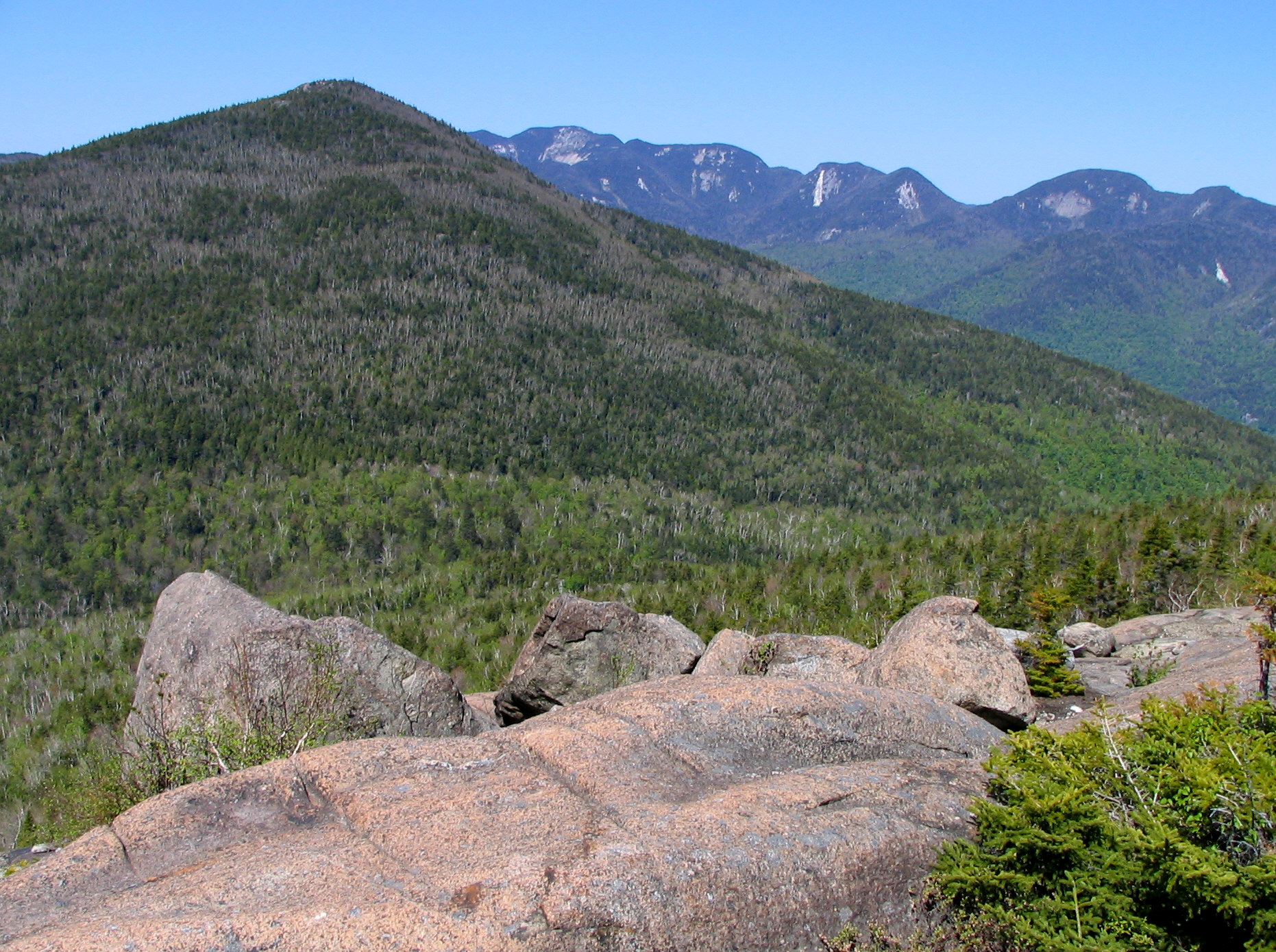
Noonmark from Round Mountain, showing the Great Range from Gothics to Lower Wolfjaw Mountain, all reachable via AMR lands

== History ==
The present clubhouse sits on the 600-acre (240 ha) site of Beede's Hotel, built in 1876. Beede's was one of the first of the Adirondack hotels to cater to wealthy sportsmen eager to escape city life during the summer, a phenomenon that predated the Civil War, but that was greatly accelerated by advances in transportation offered by steam ships and railroads. Beede's was notorious for its austere accommodations, but no less famous for its setting near Upper and Lower Ausable Lakes and the Ausable River, and for its views of Giant and Noonmark Mountains, Sawteeth and Mount Colvin. Guides were available to lead parties up the rocky ravine of the Ausable to lean-to shelters on the lakes, and thence to the high peaks above.

When it became known that a sale between lumber companies for the Ausable Lake region temporarily fell through, prominent Philadelphia mining engineer and summer resident William G. Neilson acted with “dispatch and courage” and secured a two-month option on the property dated September 20, 1886. Neilson then approached several friends to join in the purchase of 25,000 acres (100 km^{2}), including the two lakes and nearby mountains. By December 1, 1886, William Neilson, William Alderson, George Burnham, Charles Hinchman, J.W. Fuller, Richard Dale and Edward Howell provided the down payment to secure a two-year warranty deed which was signed by Neilson and Alderson. By October 1887, twenty-nine stockholders had formed a corporation, the Adirondack Mountain Reserve. Although the Reserve prohibited hunting and camping, the land remained open to the public for hiking. The AMR added to its holdings, reaching a peak of 40,000 acres (16,000 ha) in 1910. However, in 1923 and again in 1978, land was sold to the state of New York as part of the Adirondack Park, so that present holdings amount to about 7,000 acres (2,800 ha).

In 1890, Neilson approached his friend Beede, and again, secured a two month option to purchase the Beede Hotel. Neilson then presented the option to the AMR Shareholders who agreed to purchase the Hotel property and formed the Keene Heights Hotel Company which was organized to operate as a financially separate entity. In the midst of the sale the building burned to the ground. The Corporation then hired the Philadelphia architectural firm Wilson Brothers & Company to design the St. Hubert's Inn and four months later the new hotel opened as the present structure. At the same time, Neilson purchased the 40 acre- Widow Beede- property which he then donated to the organization. By 1904 due to a Park wide decline in public interest and compounded by the forest fires in 1903, the Hotel proved unprofitable and the Hotel Company was closed in 1904. It is interesting to note that the Reserve had remained profitable. In 1905 the AMR integrated the Hotel Company and is now known as the Adirondack Mountain Reserve/ Ausable Club.

== The clubhouse ==
The clubhouse is a 3 1/2-story clapboard building with sparing use of Queen Anne details, arranged in two long blocks joined at a 22.5 degree angle where a large 3-story octagonal porch provides sheltered access to the surrounding views. In addition, a porch runs the full length of the first floor. Protected by its status on the National Register of Historic Places, the building has suffered remarkably little change, inside or out, since it was built.

The Ausable Club Preservation Foundation has 501(c)(3) Public Charity status; in 2024 it reported total revenue of $431,144 and total assets of $3,067,306.
