= McKenzie Mountain =

Mountain in New York, United States

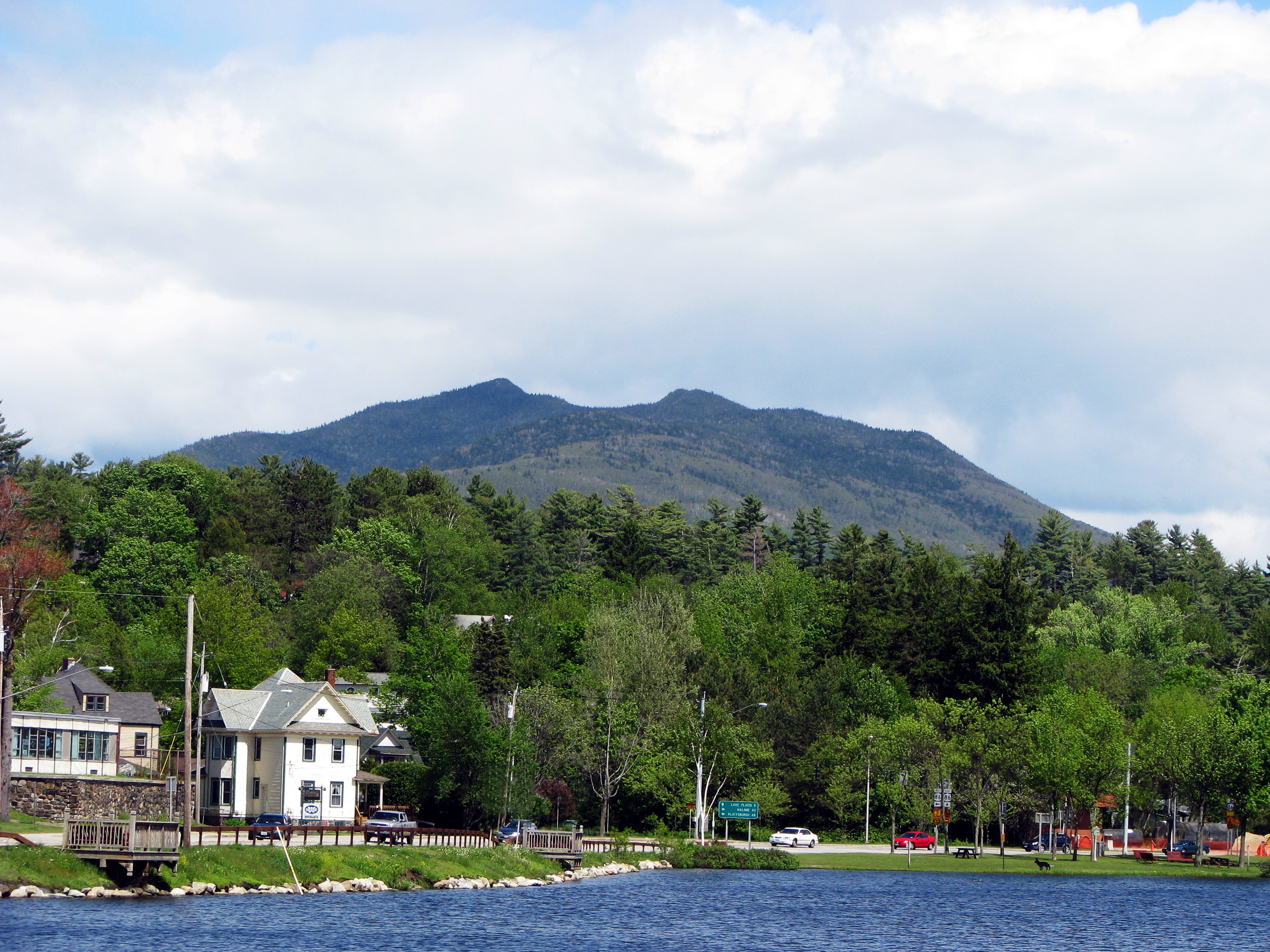
- McKenzie Mountain from Lake Flower, Saranac Lake, NY

Highest point
- Elevation: 3,861 ft (1,177 m)
- Prominence: 617 ft (188 m)
- Coordinates: 44°20′10″N 74°01′53″W

Geography
- Location: North Elba, New York, U.S.
- Parent range: Adirondacks
- Topo map: Saranac Lake

McKenzie Mountain is a 3,861-foot (1,177 m) mountain in western Essex County in the towns of St. Armand and North Elba in the Adirondack Park, a unit of the Forest Preserve.

== History ==
The mountain was formerly known as Saddleback, due to its shape. There are two trails to the top. One, maintained by NYSDEC, begins at the Jackrabbit Ski Trail, that runs between Saranac Lake and Lake Placid. The other, maintained by the Lake Placid Shore Owner's Association, dates to 1896; it leads from the Lake Shore Path to the summit. Views from the top are extensive, from Whiteface Mountain to the north, with Lake Placid at its feet, to Gothics, Mount Marcy and the Great Range, and the Seward Mountains to the south. A ledge to the west of the trail offers views of the village of Saranac Lake and the Saranac Lakes spread out beyond, Moose Pond, Azure Mountain, Saint Regis Mountain and Debar Mountain to the north.

== Climate ==
Climate data for McKenzie Mountain 44.3358 N, 74.0347 W, Elevation: 3,514 ft (1,071 m) (1991–2020 normals)
Month	Jan	Feb	Mar	Apr	May	Jun	Jul	Aug	Sep	Oct	Nov	Dec	Year
Mean daily maximum °F (°C)	21.6 (−5.8)	23.9 (−4.5)	31.5 (−0.3)	45.6 (7.6)	58.5 (14.7)	66.9 (19.4)	70.9 (21.6)	69.6 (20.9)	63.7 (17.6)	50.8 (10.4)	37.0 (2.8)	27.1 (−2.7)	47.3 (8.5)
Daily mean °F (°C)	12.8 (−10.7)	14.5 (−9.7)	22.4 (−5.3)	35.6 (2.0)	48.1 (8.9)	57.0 (13.9)	61.3 (16.3)	60.0 (15.6)	53.7 (12.1)	41.9 (5.5)	29.6 (−1.3)	19.5 (−6.9)	38.0 (3.4)
Mean daily minimum °F (°C)	4.0 (−15.6)	5.1 (−14.9)	13.3 (−10.4)	25.5 (−3.6)	37.8 (3.2)	47.1 (8.4)	51.8 (11.0)	50.3 (10.2)	43.8 (6.6)	33.0 (0.6)	22.2 (−5.4)	12.0 (−11.1)	28.8 (−1.7)
Average precipitation inches (mm)	3.75 (95)	2.79 (71)	3.48 (88)	4.44 (113)	4.78 (121)	5.85 (149)	5.31 (135)	4.93 (125)	4.68 (119)	5.31 (135)	4.24 (108)	4.06 (103)	53.62 (1,362)
Source: PRISM Climate Group

== Gallery ==
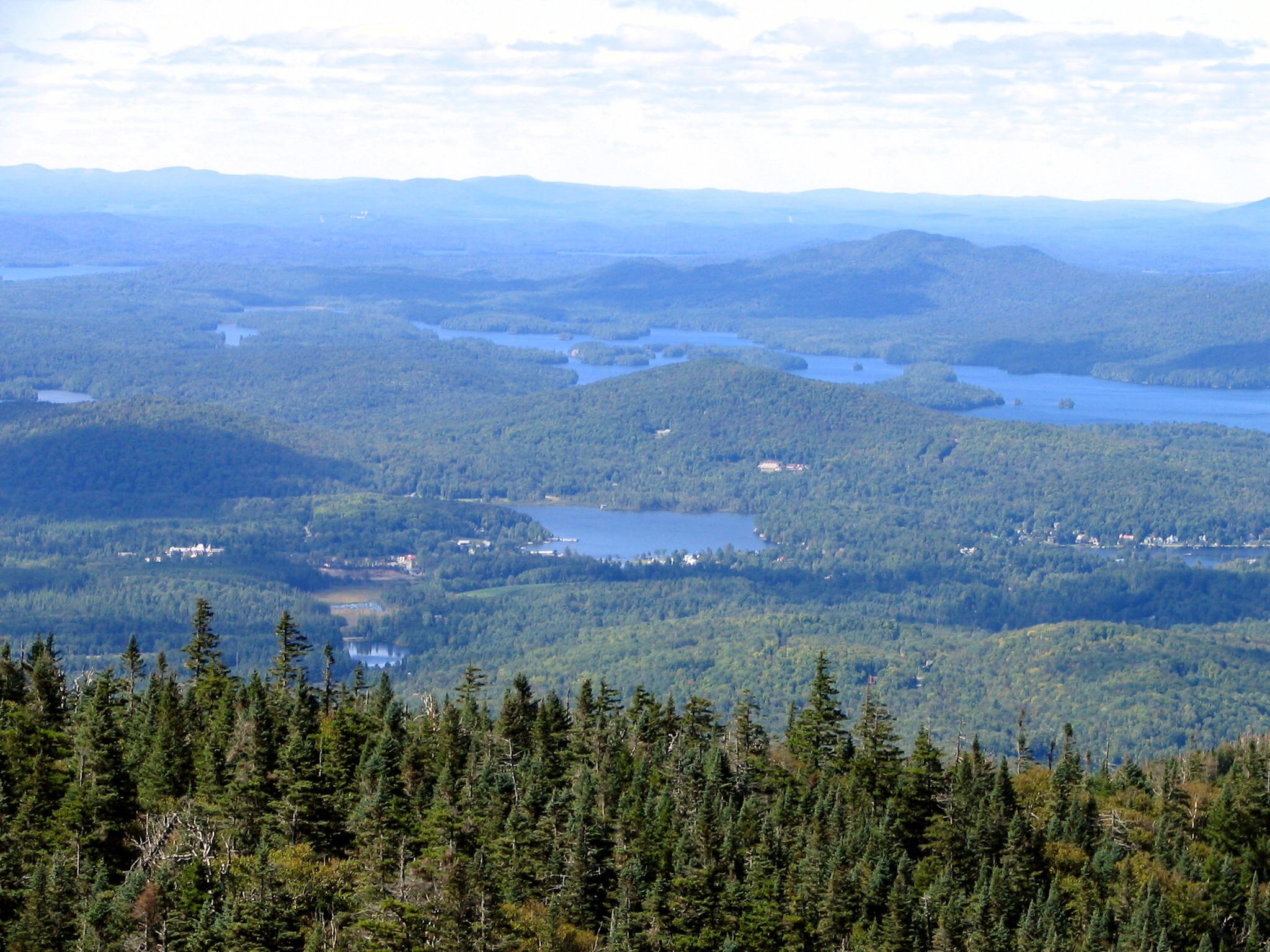
Lake Flower, Lower Saranac Lake and Boot Bay Mountain from McKenzie

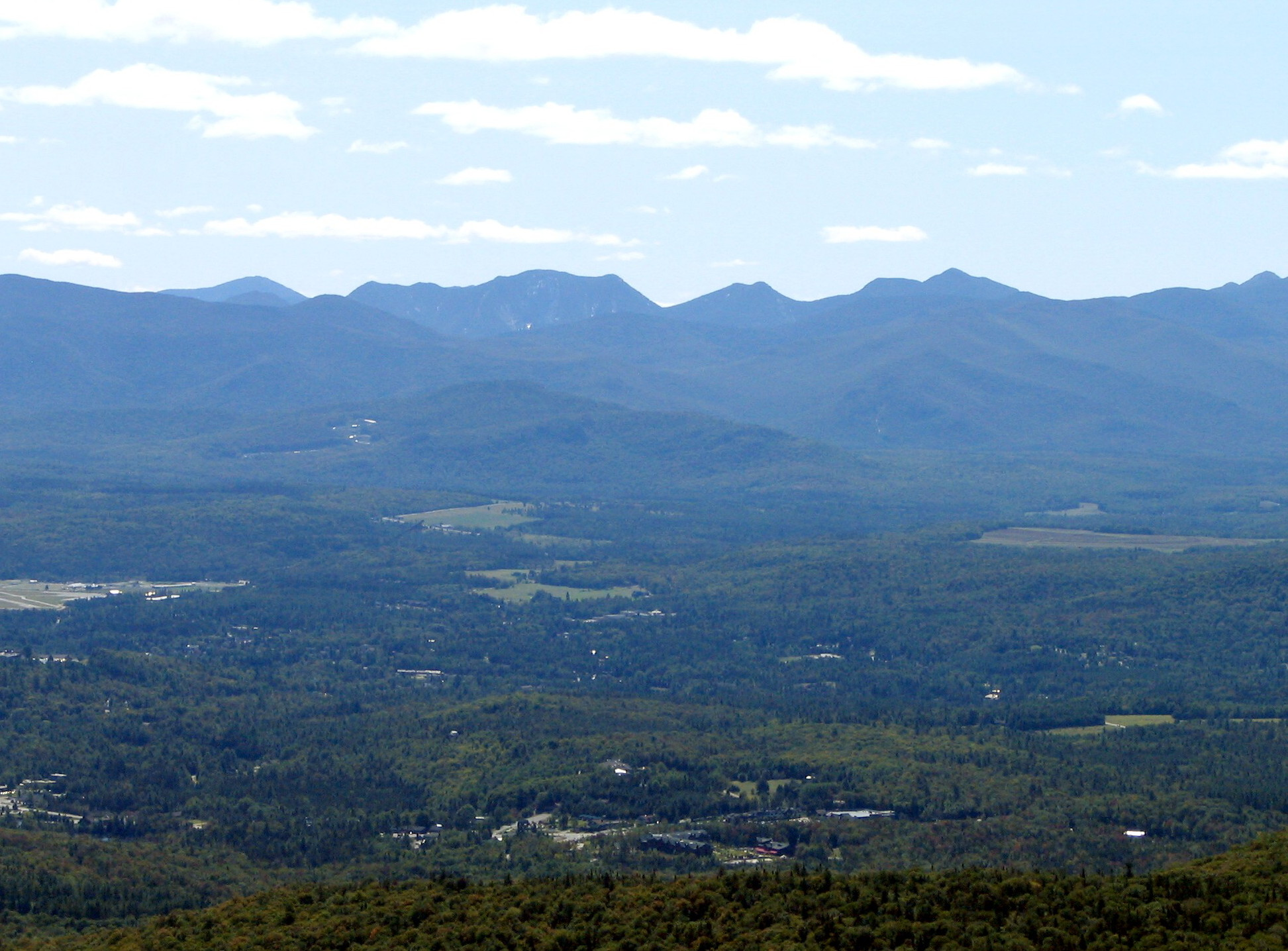
Lake Placid village, foreground, Armstrong Mountain and Gothics from McKenzie

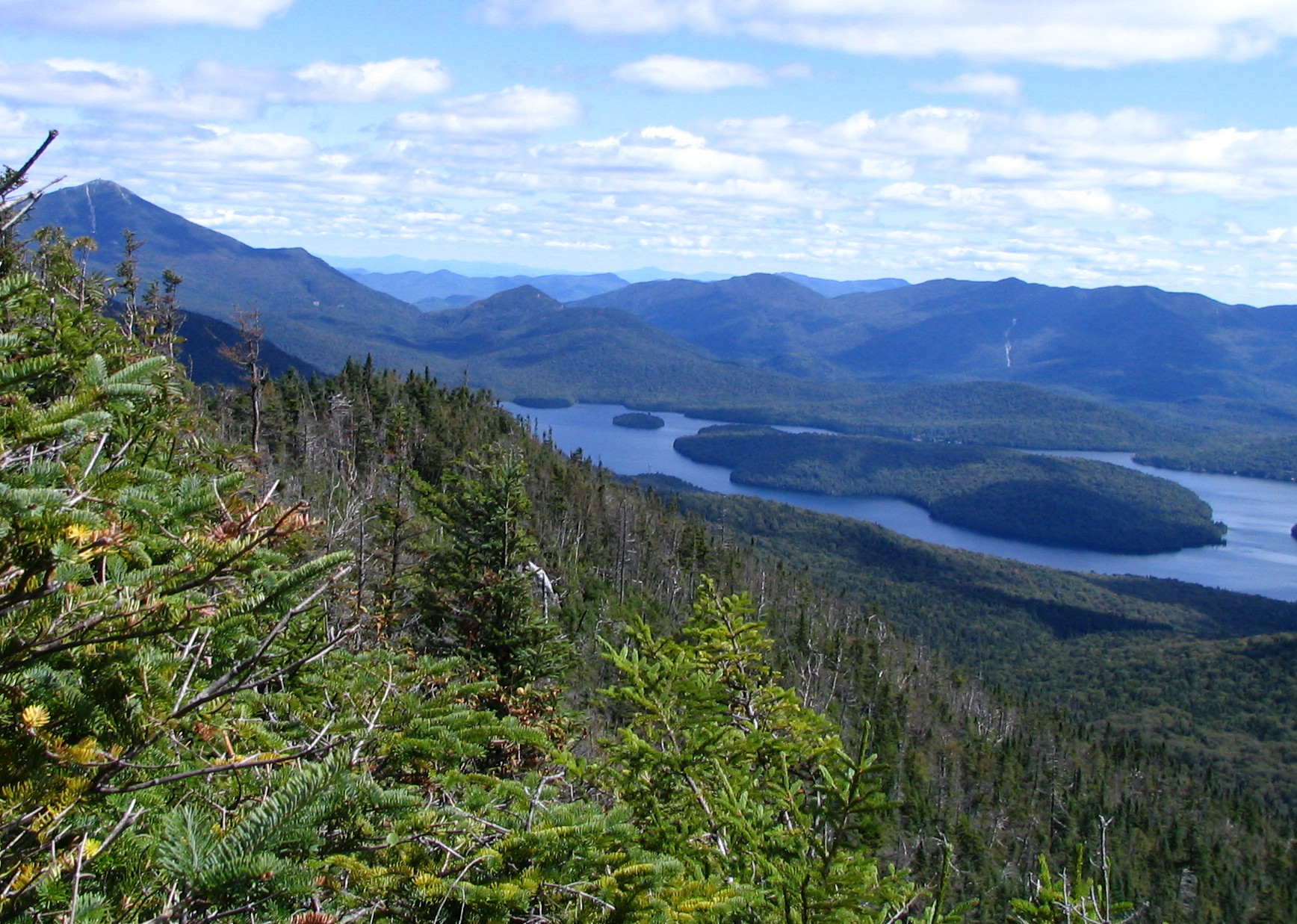
Whiteface Mountain, left, and Lake Placid, right, from McKenzie
