= Armstrong Mountain (Keene Valley, New York) =

Mountain in New York, United States

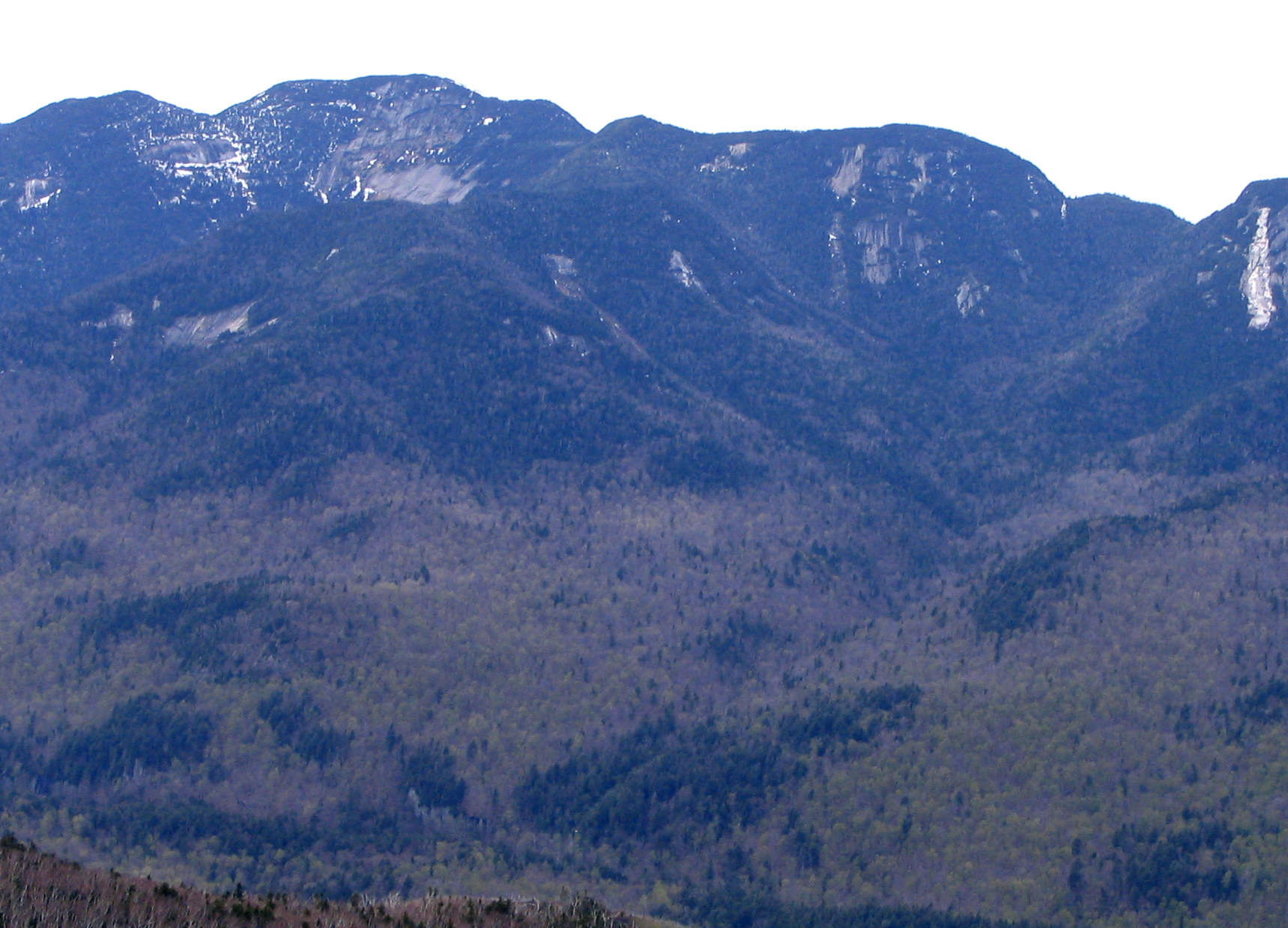
- Armstrong (center), Gothics (left) from Noonmark

Highest point
- Elevation: 4,400 ft (1,300 m) NGVD 29
- Listing: Adirondack High Peaks 22nd
- Coordinates: 44°08′05″N 73°50′57″W

Geography
- Location within New York Adirondack Park Location within the United States
- Location: Keene, Essex County, New York
- Parent range: Great Range
- Topo map: USGS Keene Valley

Climbing
- First ascent: 1875, by Ed Phelps and Thomas P. Wickes
- Easiest route: Hike

Armstrong Mountain is a mountain in the Great Range of the Adirondack Mountains, in the U.S. state of New York. It is the 22nd-highest of the Adirondack High Peaks, with an elevation of 4,400 feet (1,300 m). It is located in the town of Keene in Essex County. The mountain is named for Thomas Armstrong, a lumberman from Plattsburgh.

== History ==
In 1866, Armstrong and a business partner, Almon Thomas, purchased the Totten and Crossfield Purchase, which contained the mountain and several of the other High Peaks. Armstrong named the mountain after himself in 1869, although the name was not popularized among local hikers until years later. The earliest recorded ascent was made by Ed Phelps and Thomas P. Wickes in 1875. In 1887, the Totten and Crossfield Purchase was sold to the Adirondack Mountain Reserve.

== Hiking trails ==
The mountain can be climbed via the Phelps Trail and ADK Range Trail. The Phelps Trail begins at the Garden Parking Lot in Keene Valley on New York State Route 73. The ADK Range Trail branches off at a DEC Interior Outpost located 3.1 miles (5.0 km) from the trailhead. The trail continues to the Wolf Jaws Notch, located between Lower Wolfjaw Mountain and Upper Wolfjaw Mountain, and branches between the two.

The trail to the right goes over Upper Wolfjaw and continues to the summit of Armstrong, 3.9 miles (6.3 km) from the DEC Interior Outpost, for a total one-way distance of 7.0 miles (11.3 km) and elevation gain of 2,500 feet (760 m). The summit offers views of Johns Brook Valley and the other peaks of the Great Range. Alternatively, the summit can be approached from the Ausable Club on the Lake Road Trail and Beaver Meadow Trail, or climbed as part of a hike of the complete Great Range.

== See also ==
- List of mountains in New York
- Northeast 111 4,000-footers
- Adirondack High Peaks
- Adirondack Forty-Sixers
