= Sawteeth (New York) =

Mountain in the United States

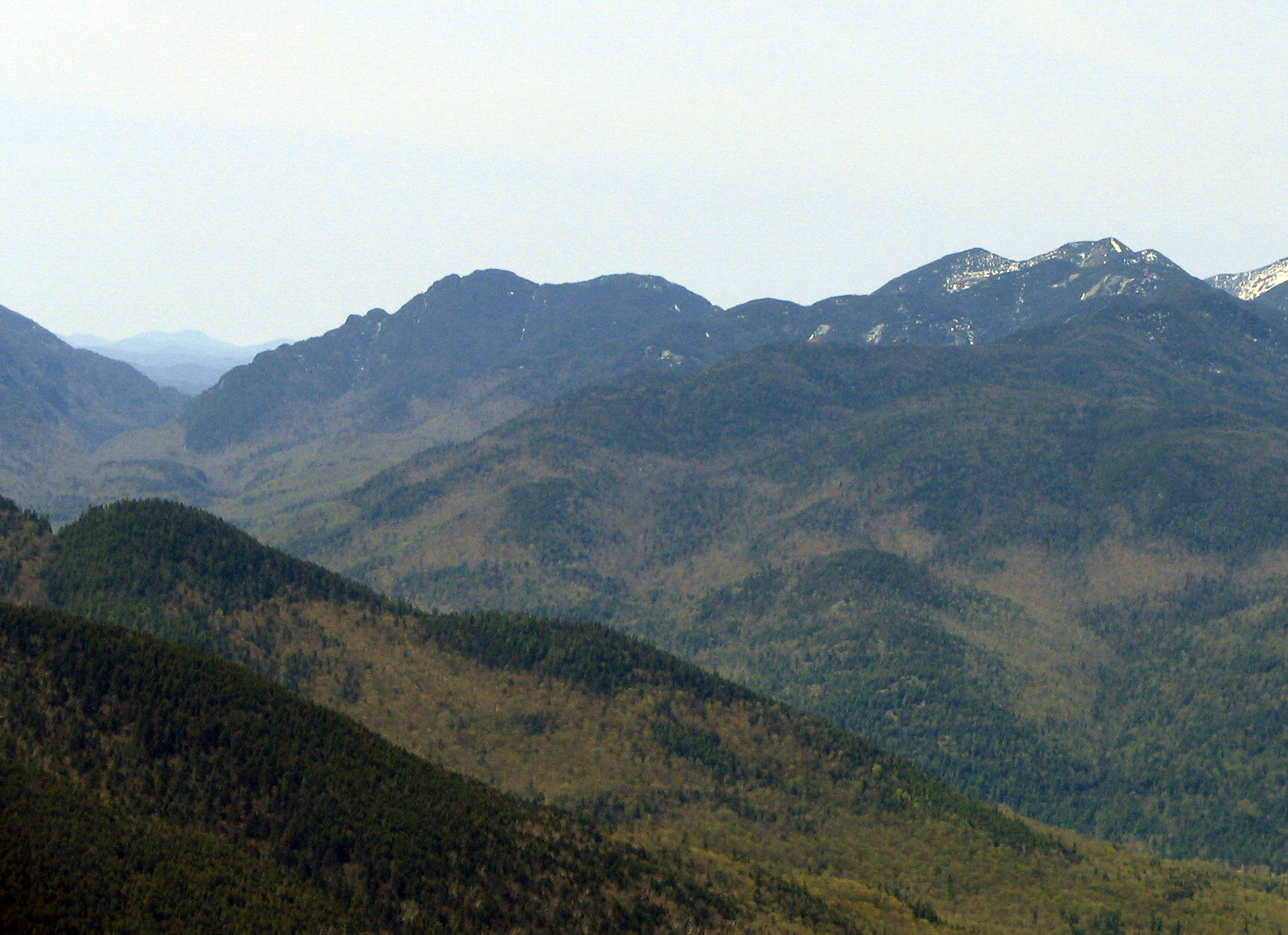
- Ausable Valley, Sawteeth (left), Pyramid and Gothics (right)

Highest point
- Elevation: 4,100 ft (1,200 m) NGVD 29
- Listing: Adirondack High Peaks 35th
- Coordinates: 44°6.80′N 73°51.04′W

Geography
- Location within New York Adirondack Park Location within the United States
- Location: Keene, Essex County, New York
- Parent range: Great Range
- Topo map: USGS Mount Marcy

Climbing
- First ascent: 1875, by Newell Martin
- Easiest route: Hike

Sawteeth (sometimes Resagonia Mountain or Sawtooth) is a mountain in the Adirondacks in the U.S. state of New York. It is the 35th-highest of the Adirondack High Peaks, with an elevation of 4,100 feet (1,200 m). The mountain is located in the town of Keene in Essex County. The name "Sawteeth" was popularized by residents of the town of Keene in the 19th century, due to the jagged appearance of its ridge from the nearby Lower Ausable Lake. Erastus Hopkins, a reverend from Massachusetts, attempted to give the mountain the alternative name "Resagonia Mountain" during this era, after Monte Resegone in the Italian Alps. The earliest recorded ascent was made by Newell Martin, a hobbyist mountain climber, in 1875.

Two trails exist to the summit of Sawteeth, both originating from the Ausable Club on Lower Ausable Lake. The trails diverge from the lake road at a bridge below the Lower Ausable Lake dam. The blue-blazed Pyramid-Gothics Trail proceeds for 1.7 miles (2.7 km) to the col between Sawteeth and Pyramid Peak, where the yellow-blazed Sawteeth trail diverges and continues left for 0.5 miles (0.80 km) to the summit, for a total one-way distance of 2.2 miles (3.5 km). The longer, older route, now known as the Scenic Trail, diverges from the Pyramid-Gothics Trail only 100 yards (91 m) from the start of the trail. The yellow-blazed trail continues along the shore of Lower Ausable Lake for 0.6 miles (0.97 km) before ascending to a series of ledges and rocks overlooking the lake. The highest of these, Lookout Rock, rises 1,300 feet (400 m) above the lake. The trail becomes very steep and ascends a series of ladders before arriving at a junction with the trail to Upper Ausable Lake. The summit of Sawteeth is just beyond it, for a total one-way distance of 3.0 miles (4.8 km) and an ascent of 2,275 feet (693 m) from Lower Ausable Lake.

== See also ==
- List of mountains in New York
- Northeast 111 4,000-footers
- Adirondack High Peaks
- Adirondack Forty-Sixers
