= Adirondack Trail Improvement Society =

U.S. nonprofit organization

- Abbreviation: ATIS
- Formation: 1897; 129 years ago
- Type: Nonprofit
- Tax ID no.: 14-1486436
- Legal status: 501(c)(3)
- Headquarters: Keene Valley, New York
- Executive Director: Ben Runyon
- Website: https://www.atistrail.org/

The Adirondack Trail Improvement Society (A.T.I.S.) is a nonprofit organization based at the Ausable Club in St. Huberts, New York, founded in 1897 first to develop and maintain and later to ensure regular maintenance and consistent marking of the trails in the St. Huberts and Ausable Lakes area of the Adirondack High Peaks. Later, the organization began hiring trail counselors to lead hiking and camping trips, thus expanding its mission to include education on the proper use and enjoyment of the Adirondack wilderness.

Today, the organization hires a seasonal trail crew and a counselor staff. The trail crew maintains over 100 miles (160 km) of public hiking trails during a season that runs from May to August. In June, the counselor staff conducts High Peaks Camp, a two-week residential wilderness camping program for 20 children aged 12–15. During July and August, the same staff supervises daily and overnight hiking and canoeing trips for children aged 6–15.

There is also a schedule of volunteer-led trips for adults, and occasional lectures and other events during the summer season. Each month's activities are culminated by a picnic supper at the Lower Ausable Lake. The picnic includes water sports, canoe races, recognition of achievements and, in August, a skit.

The A.T.I.S. is funded by donations from its membership, which is open to all who share the Society's goals and ideals.
