= Saddleback Mountain (Keene, New York) =

Mountain in New York, United States

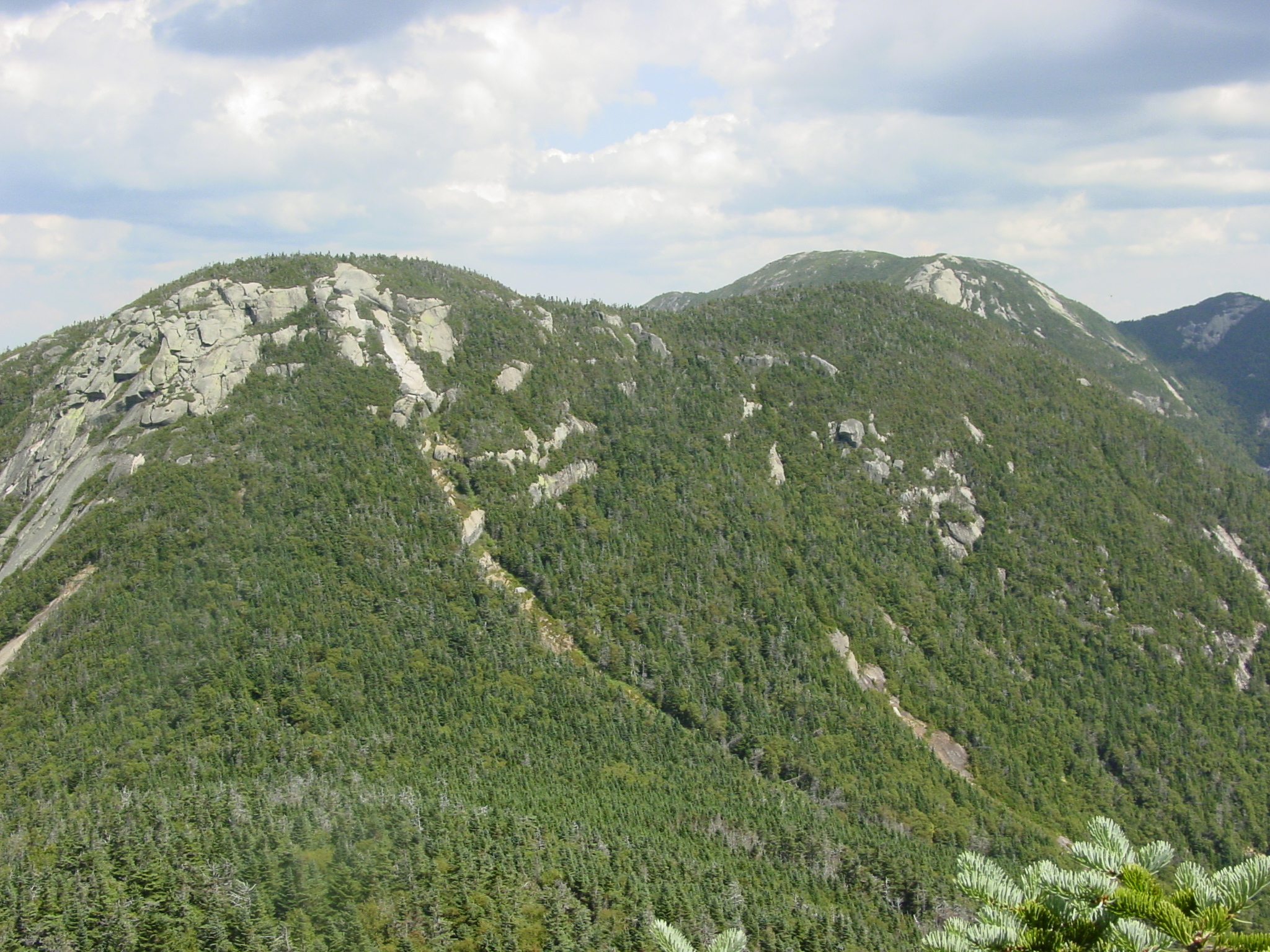
- Saddleback Mountain as seen from the southwest during the ascent of Basin

Highest point
- Elevation: 4,515 ft (1,376 m) NGVD 29
- Listing: Adirondack High Peaks 17th
- Coordinates: 44°7.60′N 73°52.51′W

Geography
- Location within New York Adirondack Park Location within the United States
- Location: Keene, Essex County, New York
- Parent range: Great Range
- Topo map: USGS Keene Valley / Mount Marcy

Climbing
- First ascent: August 5, 1894, by Newell Martin
- Easiest route: Hike

Saddleback Mountain is a mountain in the Great Range of the Adirondacks in the U. S. state of New York. It is the 17th-highest of the Adirondack High Peaks, with an elevation of 4,515 feet (1,376 m). It is located in Adirondack Park in the town of Keene in Essex County. The mountain was named for the outline of its ridge, which resembles a saddle, by Orson Schofield Phelps and Frederick Perkins. It is flanked by Basin Mountain, the ninth highest of the High Peaks, and Gothics, the tenth highest. Good views of the two higher mountains are offered from the summit of Saddleback. The mountain straddles the watersheds of Johns Brook and the Ausable River. The earliest recorded ascent was made by amateur climber Newell Martin on August 5, 1894. It was claimed that an earlier ascent was made by patent lawyer James J. Storrow and mountain guide Orlando Beede, but the date of this climb is unknown.

The State Range Trail travels over the summit of Saddleback. Beginning at the Garden parking lot west of Keene Valley, the Phelps Trail travels 3.5 miles (5.6 km) to the Johns Brook Lodge. The State Range Trail begins at the lodge and continues 3.1 miles (5.0 km) to the col between Gothics and Saddleback, then turns up Saddleback for the final 0.6 miles (0.97 km) to the top. The saddle-shaped ridge between the two peaks is 0.2 miles (0.32 km). Saddleback can also be hiked as part of a complete hike of the Great Range.

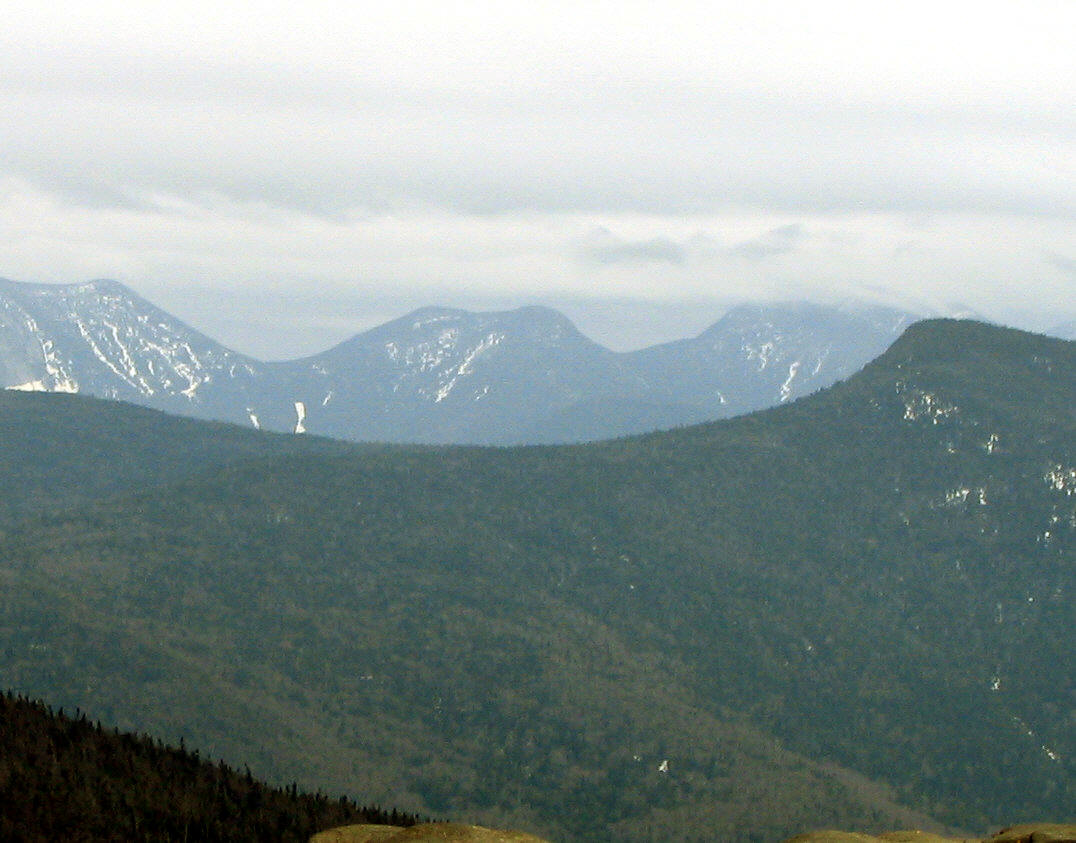
l to r: Gothics, Saddleback, Basin (in cloud); Big Slide (right middleground) — from Cascade

== See also ==
- Adirondack High Peaks
- List of mountains in New York
- Northeast 111 4,000-footers
- Adirondack Forty-Sixers
