= Upper Wolfjaw Mountain =

Mountain in the United States

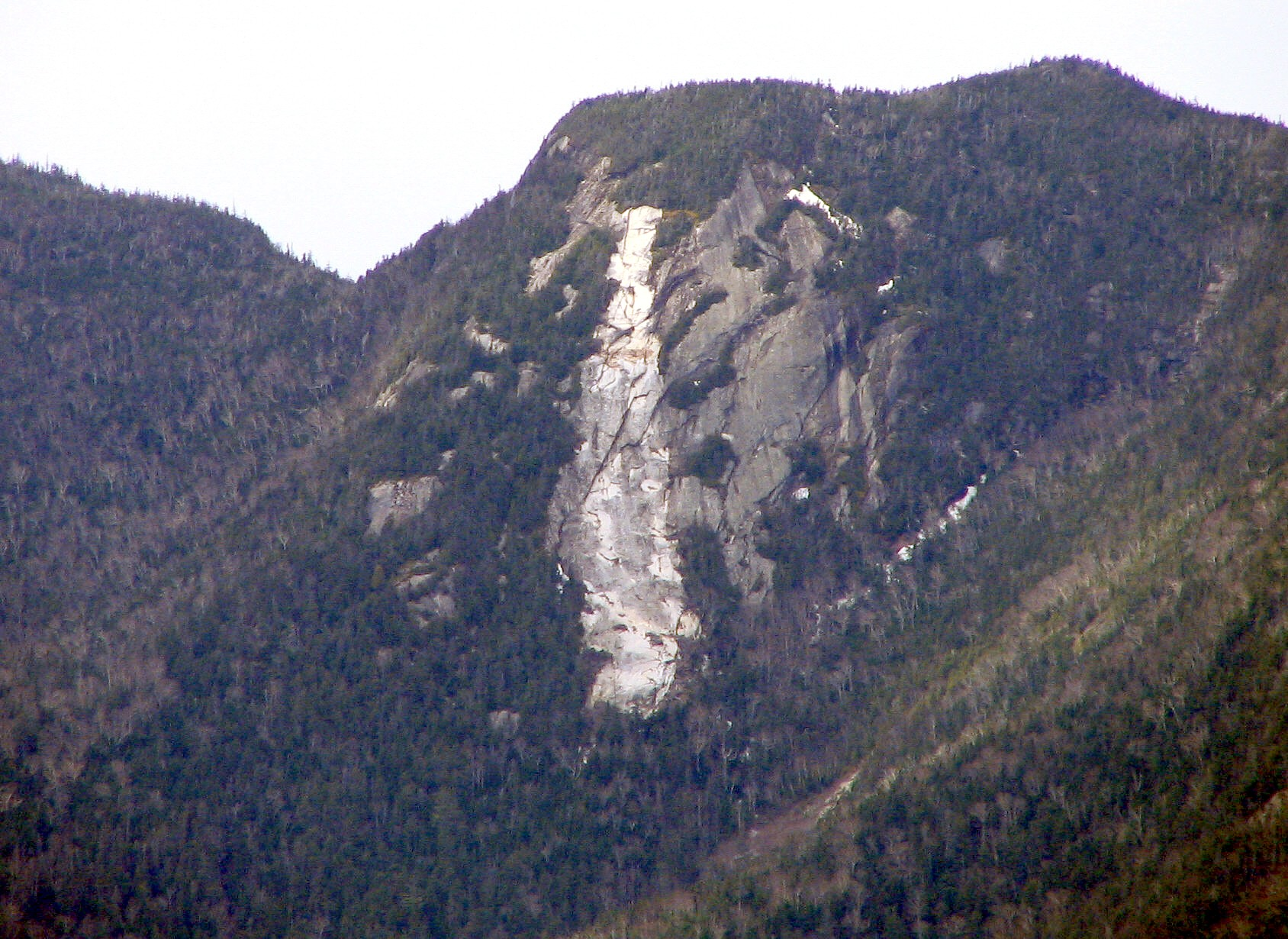
- Upper Wolfjaw Mountain from Noonmark

Highest point
- Elevation: 4,185 ft (1,276 m) NGVD 29
- Listing: Adirondack High Peaks 29th
- Coordinates: 44°8.43′N 73°50.72′W

Geography
- Location within New York Adirondack Park Location within the United States
- Location: Keene, Essex County, New York
- Parent range: Great Range
- Topo map: USGS Keene Valley

Climbing
- First ascent: October 11, 1875, by Verplanck Colvin, Ed Phelps, and Roderick L. McKenzie
- Easiest route: Hike

Upper Wolfjaw Mountain is a mountain in the Great Range of the Adirondack Mountains in the U.S. state of New York. It is the 29th-highest of the Adirondack High Peaks, with an elevation of 4,185 feet (1,276 m). It is located in the town of Keene in Essex County. Landscape artist Alexander Helwig Wyant named the mountain, in combination with neighboring Lower Wolfjaw Mountain, for their appearance in profile c. 1870. The first recorded ascent of the mountain was made on October 11, 1875, by surveyor Verplanck Colvin and trail guides Ed Phelps and Roderick L. McKenzie. Upper Wolfjaw Mountain is flanked to the southwest by Armstrong Mountain, and to the northeast by Lower Wolfjaw Mountain.

A hike of the entire Great Range crosses over the summit of Upper Wolfjaw. The mountain can also be reached on the ADK Range Trail, which begins at the DEC Interior Outpost on the Phelps Trail. The Phelps Trail begins at the Garden Parking Lot on New York State Route 73 and continues 3.1 miles (5.0 km) to the DEC Interior Outpost. The Range Trail diverges here and continues 2.0 miles (3.2 km) to the notch between Upper and Lower Wolfjaw Mountains. The trail splits between the two summits, and the right fork continues 0.9 miles (1.4 km) to the summit of Upper Wolfjaw Mountain. On the northwestern slope of the mountain, there are several rock slides which can be climbed, the uppermost of which is the Skinny Slide, formed by Hurricane Floyd in 1999.

== See also ==
- List of mountains in New York
- Northeast 111 4,000-footers
- Adirondack High Peaks
- Adirondack Forty-Sixers
