= Basin Mountain (New York) =

Mountain in New York, United States

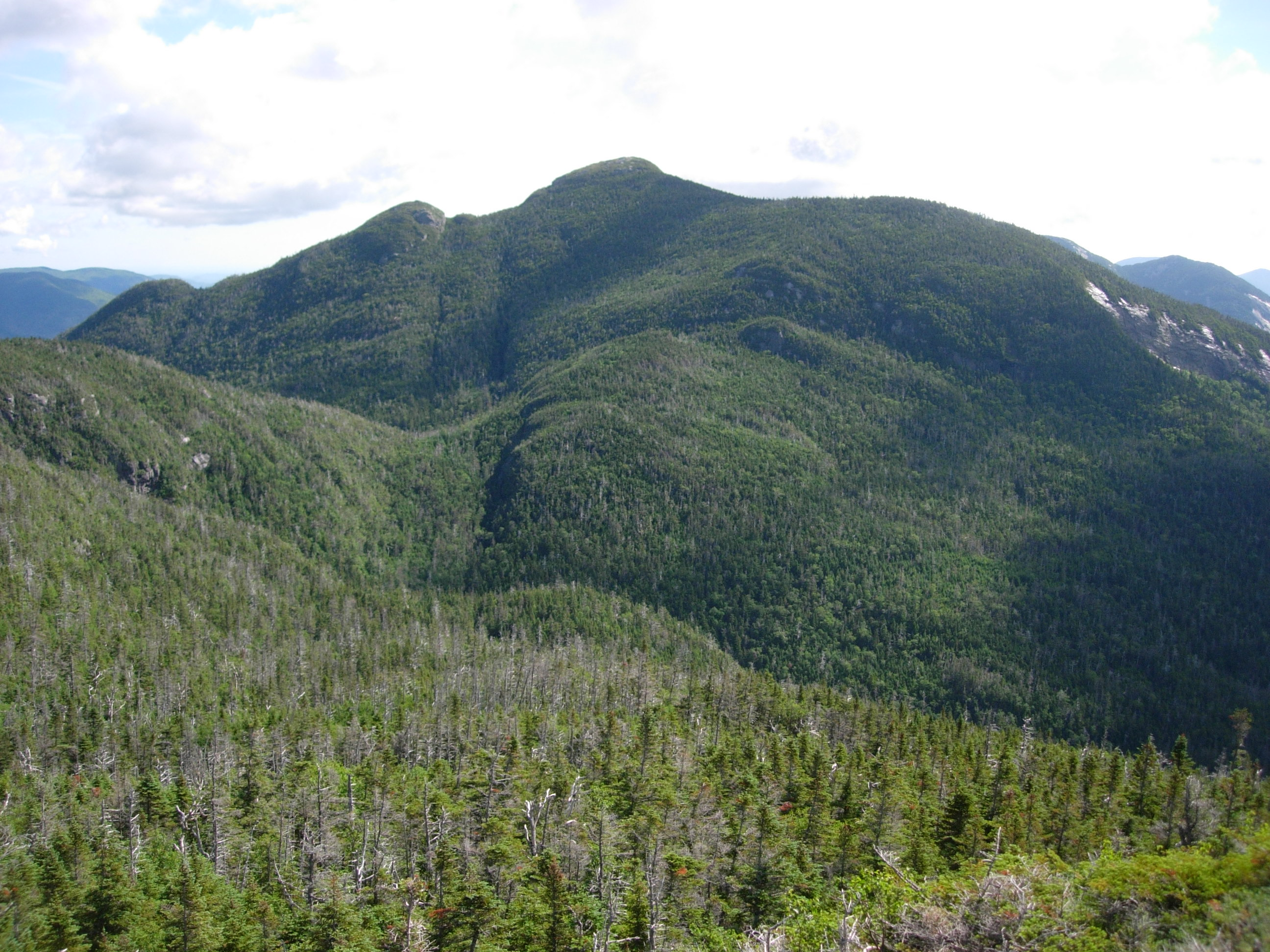
- Basin as seen from Haystack

Highest point
- Elevation: 4,827 ft (1,471 m) NGVD 29
- Listing: Adirondack High Peaks 9th
- Coordinates: 44°07′16″N 73°53′11″W

Geography
- Location within New York Adirondack Park Location within the United States
- Location: Keene, New York, U.S.
- Parent range: Adirondacks
- Topo map: USGS Keene Valley

Climbing
- First ascent: Between 1869 and 1871 by James J. Storrow and Orlando Beede
- Easiest route: Hike

Basin Mountain is a mountain in the Great Range of the Adirondacks in the U.S. state of New York. It is the ninth-highest peak in New York, with an elevation of 4,827 feet (1,471 m), and one of the 46 High Peaks in Adirondack Park. It is located in the town of Keene in Essex County. The peak was named either for the basins formed between knobs on its slopes or the large basin to its southeast formed by it and the surrounding mountains. The name Basin was most likely coined by Orson Schofield Phelps and Frederick W. Perkins in 1857 during an ascent of Mount Marcy. The earliest appearance of the name in writing was made by surveyor Verplanck Colvin in 1873.

Basin Mountain can be climbed from many trailheads in the High Peaks Wilderness Area. Steep ledges on the west side of the mountain make backpacking over the mountain difficult. The State Range Trail, which begins at Johns Brook Lodge, crosses over Basin and other peaks of the Great Range. From the lodge, the route to the summit of Basin is 4.5 miles (7.2 km), for 2,870 feet (870 m) of total ascent, crossing over Saddleback Mountain on the way. From the south, the State Range Trail intersects with the Shorey Short Cut, the Haystack Brook Trail, and the Phelps Trail. The mountain can also be crossed as part of a hike of the entire Great Range. The summit of the mountain is an alpine zone, and offers views of Gothics to the east, Shanty Brook Valley to the southeast, Upper Ausable Lake to the South, Mount Haystack to the southwest, and Mount Marcy to the west.
