= Noonmark Mountain =

Mountain in New York, United States

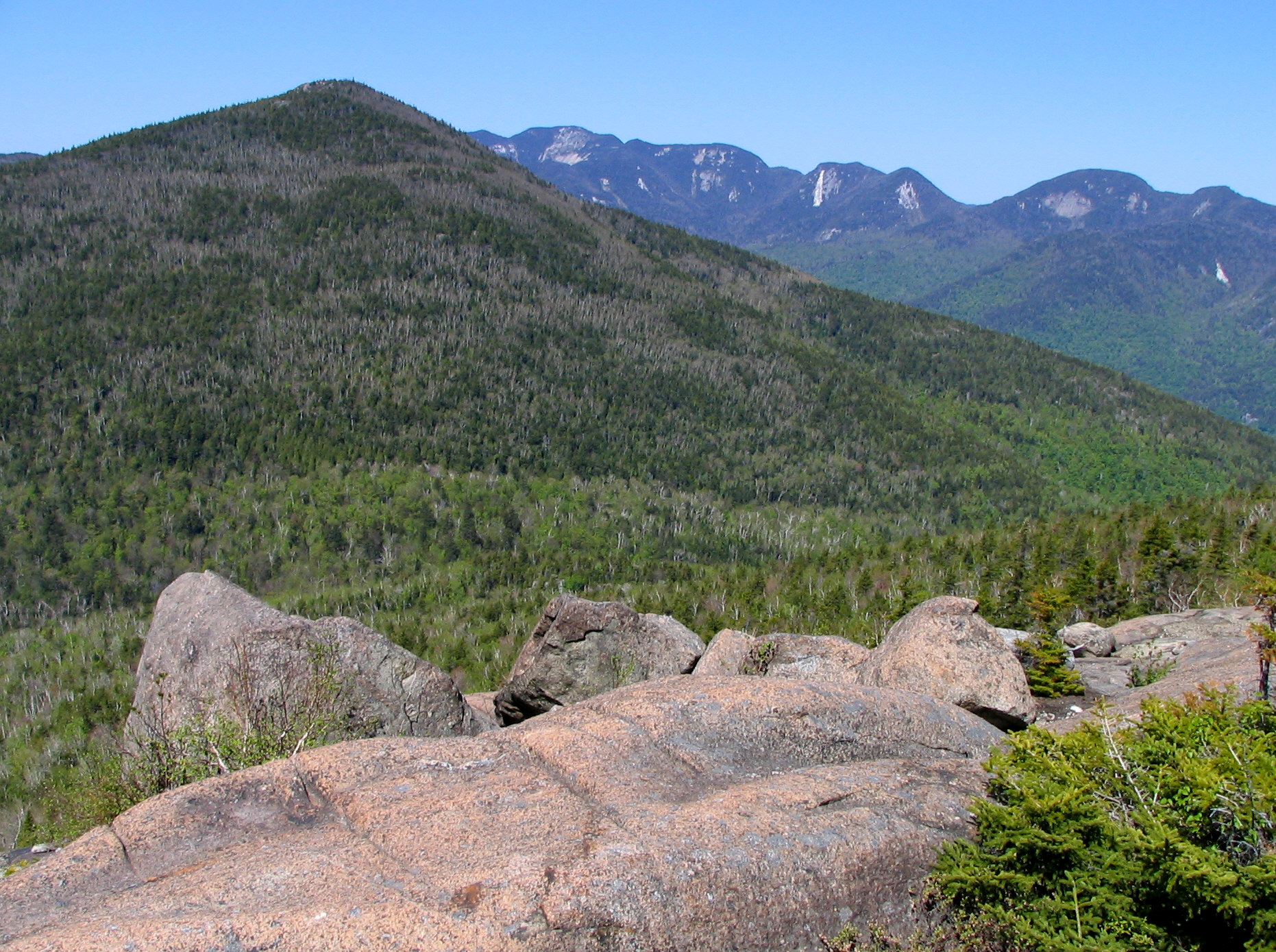
- Noonmark from Round Mountain, showing the Great Range from Gothics to Lower Wolfjaw Mountain

Highest point
- Elevation: 3,556 ft (1,084 m)
- Prominence: 790 ft (240 m)
- Coordinates: 44°07′43.4″N 73°46′21.2″W

Geography
- Location: Keene, New York, U.S.
- Parent range: Adirondacks
- Topo map: USGS Keene Valley

Climbing
- Easiest route: Stimson Trail

Noonmark Mountain is a 3,556-foot (1,084 m) mountain near St. Huberts in the High Peaks region of the Adirondacks in New York, United States. The prominent peak provides 360-degree views, including the Great Range, the Dix Range, Giant Mountain, the Ausable River valley, and the village of Keene. When seen from the nearby hamlet of Keene Valley, where it dominates the view, the peak of Noonmark Mountain is more or less directly beneath the sun at mid-day.

There are two trails up the mountain. The Felix Adler Trail, named for Dr. Felix Adler, founder of the Ethical Culture Society and a hiker who spent summers in St. Huberts, near the start of the trail. The Stimson Trail is named for Henry L. Stimson, who scouted the original trail, and who served as Secretary of State under Herbert Hoover and Secretary of War under Franklin D. Roosevelt.

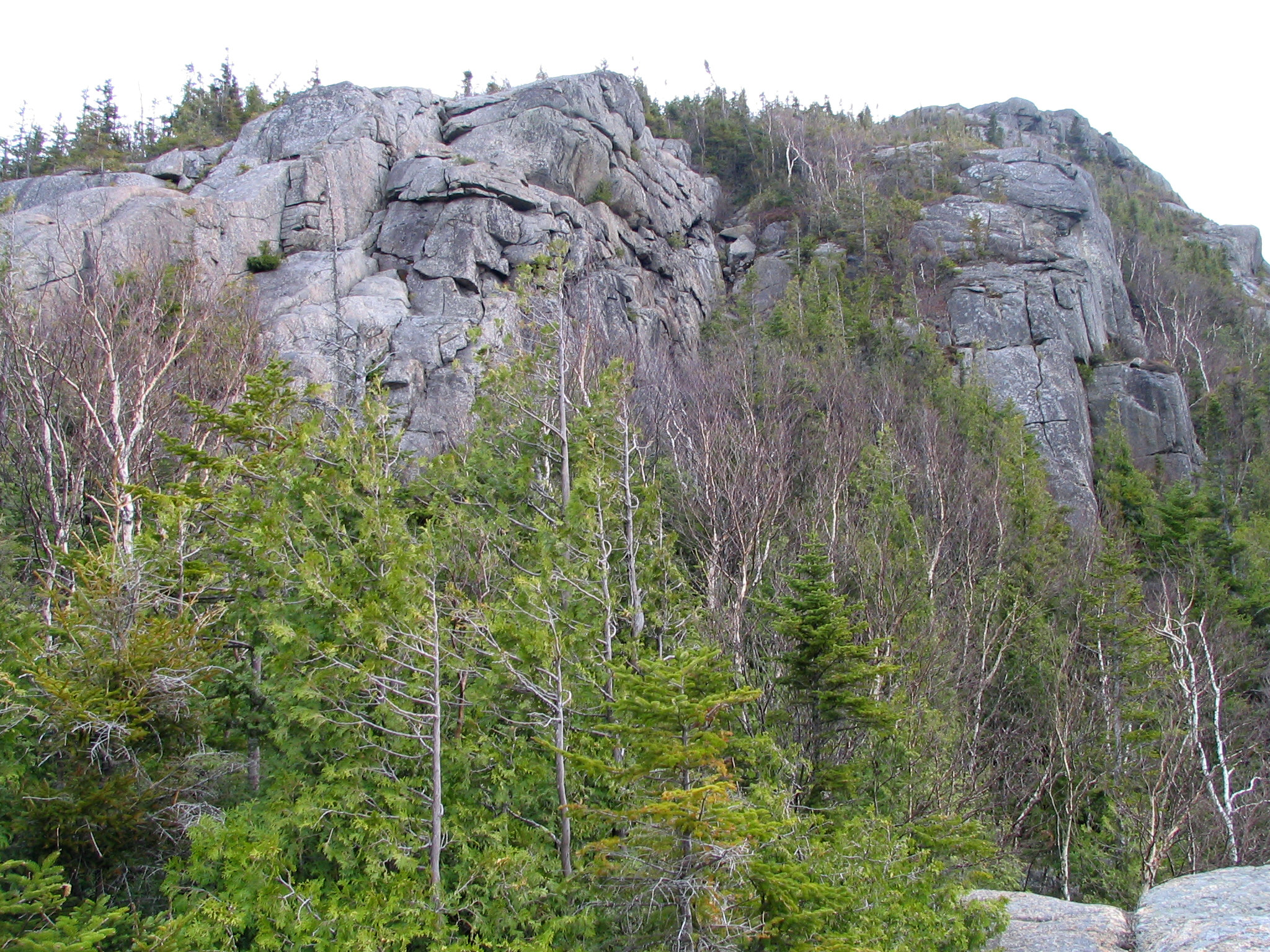
Noonmark peak from the Stimson Trail
