= Mount Haystack =

Mountain in New York, United States

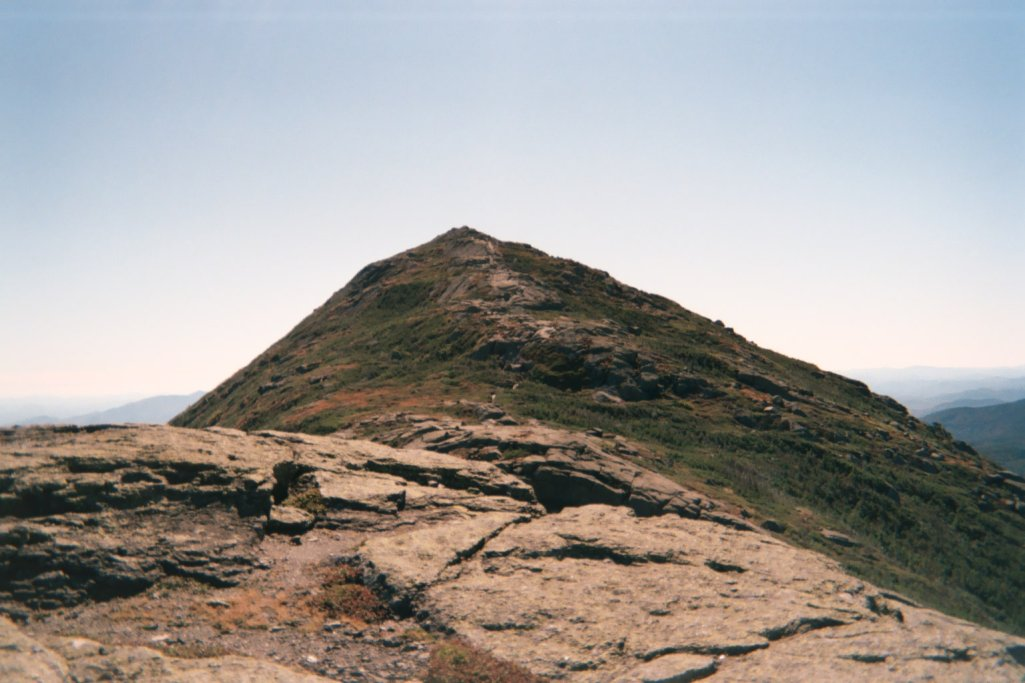
- Mount Haystack from Little Haystack

Highest point
- Elevation: 4,960 ft (1,510 m) NGVD 29
- Listing: Adirondack High Peaks 3rd
- Coordinates: 44°06′20″N 73°54′2″W

Geography
- Location within New York Adirondack Park Location within the United States
- Location: Keene, New York, U.S.
- Parent range: Adirondacks
- Topo map: USGS Mount Marcy

Climbing
- First ascent: 1849 by Orson Schofield Phelps, Almeron Oliver, and George Etsy
- Easiest route: Hike

Mount Haystack is a mountain in the Great Range of the Adirondack Mountains of New York. With an elevation of 4,960 feet (1,510 m), it is the third-highest mountain in New York and one of the 46 High Peaks in Adirondack Park. It is located in the town of Keene in Essex County. The first recorded ascent of the mountain was made by mountain guide Orson Schofield Phelps in 1849, accompanied by Almeron Oliver and George Etsy. Phelps gave the mountain its current name based on its appearance to a haystack, and later cut the first trail to the summit in 1873. The summit is an alpine zone above the treeline, which offers a view of nearby Mount Marcy and Panther Gorge.

Two trails can be used to access the summit of Haystack. The mountain can be approached from the north by following the Johns Brook Trail from the Garden parking area in Keene Valley to the Phelps Trail, passing the DEC Interior Outpost and Johns Brook Lodge, and then following the State Range Trail from a junction between the two. The northern trail to Haystack branches from the State Range Trail 0.6 miles (0.97 km) from the summit. The distance from Keene Valley to the DEC Interior Outpost is 3.5 miles (5.6 km) and Haystack is an additional 5.8 miles (9.3 km), for a total distance of 9.3 miles (15.0 km). It can also be approached from the south, starting at the privately owned Ausable Club. This approach involves steep, rough terrain, and is not recommended for backpackers due to the risk of falls. This route is 3.5 miles (5.6 km) from Upper Ausable Lake to the summit, with an elevation gain of 3,070 feet (940 m).

Ascents of Haystack are sometimes combined with several other peaks, including Marcy, Basin, Saddleback, or the Great Range.

== Gallery ==
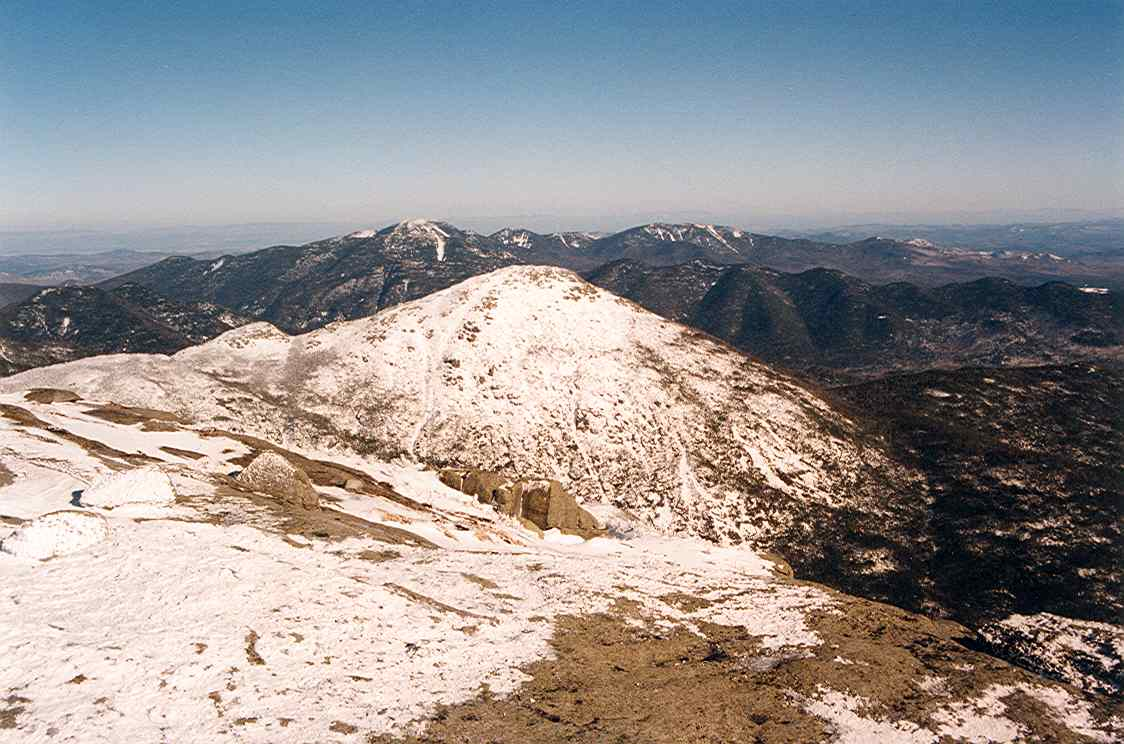
Little Haystack (left) and Mount Haystack (center), from Mount Marcy
