= Giant Mountain =

Mountain in the United States

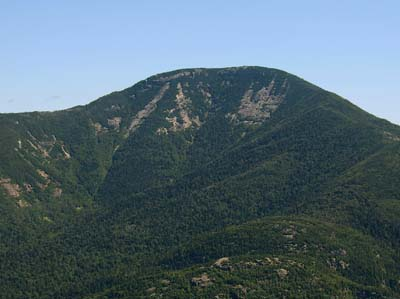
- Giant, seen from Noonmark

Highest point
- Elevation: 4,627 ft (1,410 m) NGVD 29
- Listing: Adirondack High Peaks 12th
- Coordinates: 44°09′40″N 73°43′13″W

Geography
- Location within New York Adirondack Park Location within the United States
- Location: Keene, New York, U.S.
- Parent range: Adirondacks
- Topo map: USGS Elizabethtown

Climbing
- First ascent: 2 June 1797, by Charles Brodhead and party
- Easiest route: Hike

Giant Mountain, also known as Giant of the Valley, is a mountain in the Adirondacks in the U.S. state of New York. It is the twelfth-highest peak in New York, with an elevation of 4,627 feet (1,410 m), and one of the 46 High Peaks in Adirondack Park. It is located in the Giant Mountain Wilderness Area, in the town of Keene in Essex County. The mountain is named for its towering appearance from the nearby Pleasant Valley to the east, which sits at a low elevation.

== History ==
On 2 June 1797, Charles Brodhead and his survey party made the first recorded ascent of Giant Mountain while surveying the boundaries of the Old Military Tract. Broadhead's was the first recorded ascent of any of the 46 Adirondack High Peaks. The name "Giant of the Valley" was in use as early as 1813, but was initially used to refer to a different nearby peak. By 1859, the name had shifted to the current Giant Mountain. The first hiking trail to the summit was cut by mountain guide Orson Schofield Phelps and his son Ed Phelps in 1866. A large portion of the forest on Giant and nearby Rocky Peak Ridge was destroyed by a wildfire in 1903.

== Climate ==
Climate data for Giant Mountain 44.1600 N, 73.7173 W, Elevation: 3,986 ft (1,215 m) (1991–2020 normals)
Month	Jan	Feb	Mar	Apr	May	Jun	Jul	Aug	Sep	Oct	Nov	Dec	Year
Mean daily maximum °F (°C)	18.7 (−7.4)	20.6 (−6.3)	28.1 (−2.2)	44.4 (6.9)	56.8 (13.8)	65.1 (18.4)	69.4 (20.8)	68.1 (20.1)	62.5 (16.9)	50.0 (10.0)	33.8 (1.0)	24.2 (−4.3)	45.1 (7.3)
Daily mean °F (°C)	10.7 (−11.8)	12.4 (−10.9)	20.2 (−6.6)	34.4 (1.3)	47.2 (8.4)	56.3 (13.5)	60.9 (16.1)	59.6 (15.3)	53.4 (11.9)	41.2 (5.1)	27.3 (−2.6)	17.3 (−8.2)	36.7 (2.6)
Mean daily minimum °F (°C)	2.7 (−16.3)	4.3 (−15.4)	12.3 (−10.9)	24.4 (−4.2)	37.6 (3.1)	47.5 (8.6)	52.5 (11.4)	51.1 (10.6)	44.3 (6.8)	32.4 (0.2)	20.8 (−6.2)	10.4 (−12.0)	28.4 (−2.0)
Average precipitation inches (mm)	5.21 (132)	4.08 (104)	5.27 (134)	6.35 (161)	6.43 (163)	6.72 (171)	6.62 (168)	6.11 (155)	6.03 (153)	7.07 (180)	6.31 (160)	6.39 (162)	72.59 (1,843)
Source: PRISM Climate Group

== Ascent routes ==
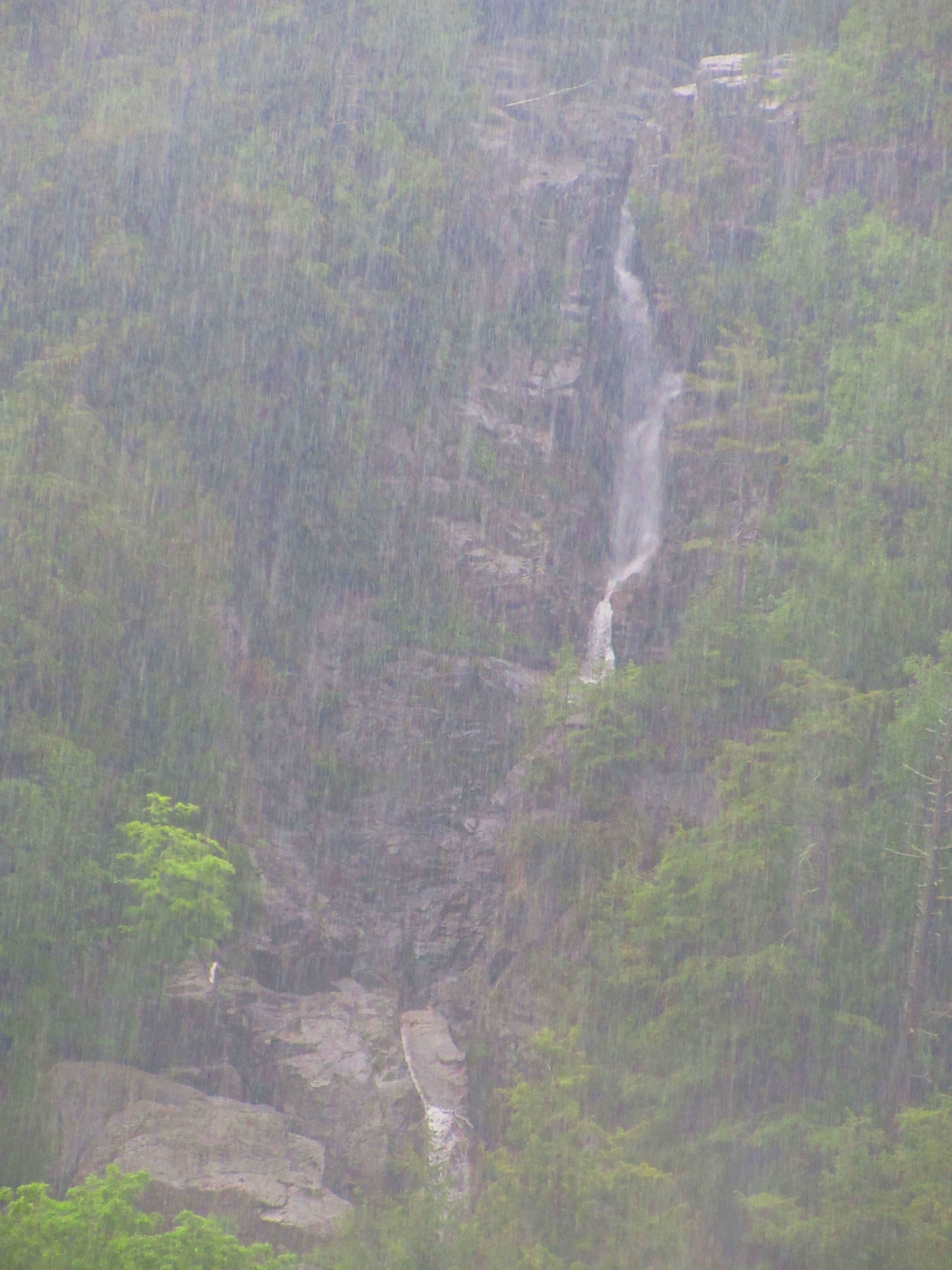
Roaring Brook Falls, the most prominent roadside waterfall in the Adirondacks, descends Giant Mountain on a rainy day.

Five trails ascend Giant Mountain. The two western approaches are the most popular and begin on trailheads along New York State Route 73, one near St. Huberts ("Roaring Brook Trail") and the other near Chapel Pond ("Ridge Trail"). Due to their popularity with hikers and the number of cars exceeding available space in the summer months, parking on the shoulder of Route 73 was banned in 2019. The two trails climb the southern ridge of the mountain, merging 0.8 miles (1.3 km) south of the summit. The Ridge Trail is slightly shorter than the Roaring Brook Trail but steeper, ascending 3,050 feet (930 m) over the course of 3.2 miles (5.1 km). It passes by a large pond known as Giants Washbowl 0.8 miles (1.3 km) from the trailhead. Alternatively, the Roaring Brook Trail ascends 3,375 feet (1,029 m) to the summit over 3.6 miles (5.8 km). There is a junction 0.5 miles (0.80 km) from the trailhead of Roaring Brook Trail for a side trail to Roaring Brook Falls.

Two other trails approach Giant Mountain from the north. The North Trail to Giant begins from a parking lot on New York State Route 9N and proceeds 7.6 miles (12.2 km) to the summit with an ascent of 3,327 feet (1,014 m). Another trail proceeds 1.7 miles (2.7 km) from the summit of Hopkins Mountain and merges with the North Trail before continuing another 1.5 miles (2.4 km) to the summit of Giant, for a total distance of 3.2 miles (5.1 km).

The East Trail begins from a parking lot on U.S. Route 9 near New Russia. This route passes through the areas burned by the 1913 wildfire, much of which are still open land today, offering views of the surrounding valleys. The route passes over the shorter Bald Peak and then begins an ascent of Rocky Peak Ridge. After summiting Rocky Peak Ridge, the trail descends a small col before merging with the Roaring Brook Trail and ascending to the Giant Mountain summit, for a total distance of 8 miles (13 km) and 5,300 feet (1,600 m) of total ascent.

Giant Mountain can also be climbed from several rock slides on its slopes. The Eagle and Bottle slides, located on the western face of the mountain, are among the most popular. The slides on Giant were enlarged by a major storm in the summer of 1963.

39 major peaks can be viewed from the summit of Giant Mountain. The Dix Range can be seen to the south, the Ausable Club and Great Range to the west, Whiteface Mountain to the north, and Lake Champlain and the Green Mountains of Vermont to the east. Additional views are offered from Giants Nubble, a rocky knob on the southwest ridge of Giant, which can be accessed on side trails branching off of the Roaring Brook Trail or the Ridge Trail.

== Gallery ==
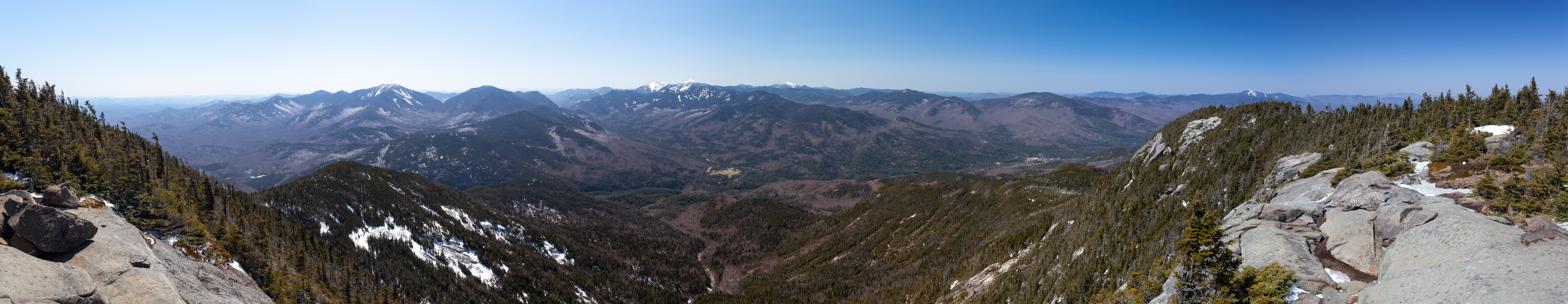
View of the Adirondack High Peaks from the summit of Giant Mountain
