= Orson Schofield Phelps =

Adirondack guide (1817–1905)

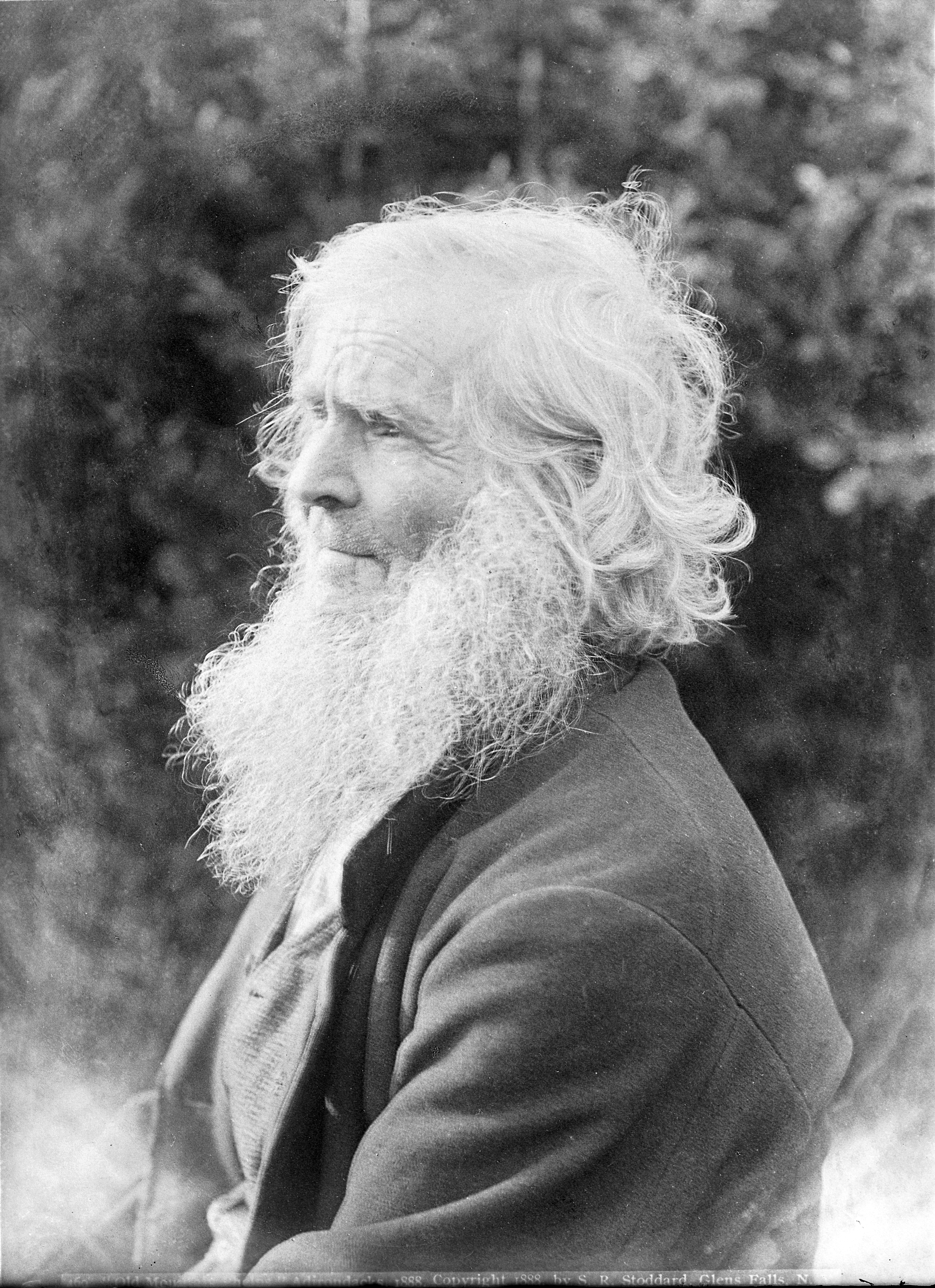
Phelps in 1888, photographed by Seneca Ray Stoddard.

Orson Schofield (Old Mountain) Phelps (May 6, 1817 - April 14, 1905) was an early Adirondack guide from Keene Valley. Although he was not regarded as a highly skilled guide, his enthusiasm for nature and poetic descriptions of the mountain scenery endeared him to many tourists. He became a local legend due to publicity from writers Charles Dudley Warner and E. R. Wallace, photographer Seneca Ray Stoddard, and others. Phelps named many of the Adirondack High Peaks and cut the first trail up Mount Marcy.

== Biography ==
Phelps was born on May 6, 1817, in Weathersfield, Vermont. In the 1830s, he moved to the Adirondacks, where he worked at the Tahawus Iron Works. Following the death of David Henderson, he settled in nearby Keene Valley and married a local woman named Melinda Lamb. He took up mountain climbing and became a professional guide to visitors. Phelps claimed to have climbed Mount Marcy, his favorite of the peaks, over a hundred times. He gave several features in the Adirondacks their present names, including the Beckhorn on Dix Mountain and Mount Haystack. During an 1857 climb with Frederick S. Perkins, the pair named Mount Skylight, Basin Mountain, Saddleback Mountain, and Gothics. Phelps blazed the first trail to the summit of Mount Marcy in 1861 and the first trail to the summit of Giant Mountain in 1866 with the assistance of his son Ed, who also worked as a guide.

Phelps worked as a guide for several prominent tourists and surveyors. Among his associates were Verplanck Colvin, Horace Bushnell, Joseph Twichell, and Noah Porter. Phelps was an avid reader of the New-York Tribune, to the point that he was nicknamed "Old Greeley", and intentionally sought out intellectual guests. In 1864, Lucia Pychowska hired Phelps to guide her to Marcy, and published an account of her journey and Phelps in The Continental Monthly. He achieved national fame from an 1874 profile by Seneca Ray Stoddard in his Adirondack guide book. Stoddard described Phelps as an old man,

muffled up in an immense crop of long hair, and a beard that seemed to boil up out of his collar band; grizzly as the granite ledges he climbs, shaggy as the rough-barked cedar, but with a pleasant twinkle in his eye and an elasticity to his step equaled by few younger men, while he delivers his communications, his sage conclusions and whimsical oddities, in a cheery, cherripy, squeaky sort of tone—away up on the mountains as it were—an octave above the ordinary voice, suggestive of the warblings of an ancient chickadee.

Additional profiles followed from writers Charles Dudley Warner and E. R. Wallace. As his fame increased and age advanced, Phelps became less willing to perform necessary guide work while on the trail. Many tourists who came to see the rustic old man reported disappointment and described him as lazy. In his later years, he published articles in the Essex County Republican with subjects ranging from poetry to natural history. Phelps died on April 14, 1905, in his Keene Valley home. Melinda moved to Hartford, Connecticut, to live with their daughter and died in 1917.

Phelps Mountain is named in his honor. Two streams also bear his name:

- Phelps Brook, draining the southern flank of Phelps Mountain and the western flank of Table Top Mountain.
- Phelps Brook in Keene Valley, by which he made his home at Phelps Falls.
