= Lower Wolfjaw Mountain =

Mountain in New York, United States

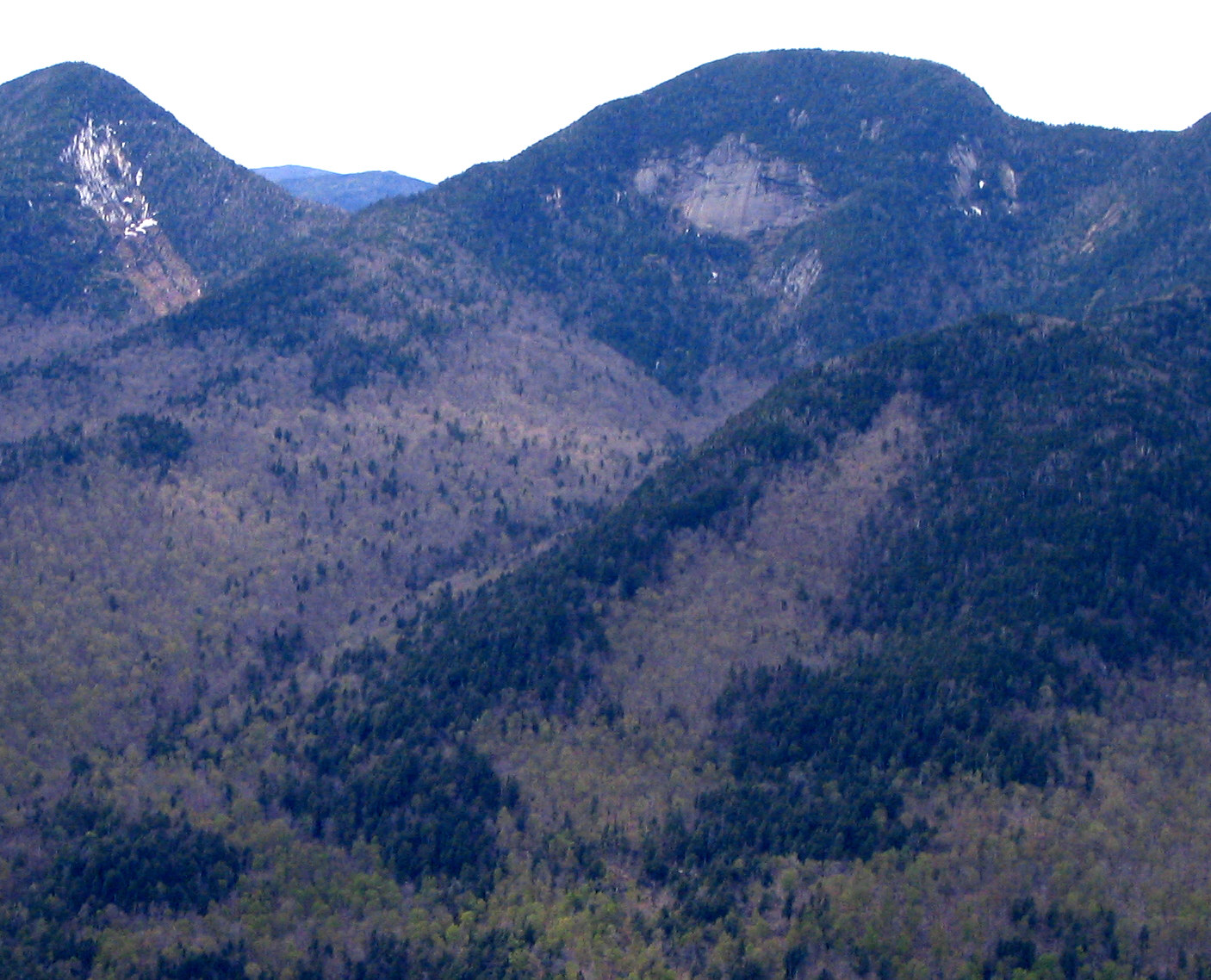
- Lower Wolfjaw from Noonmark Mountain

Highest point
- Elevation: 4,175 ft (1,273 m) NGVD 29
- Listing: Adirondack High Peaks 30th
- Coordinates: 44°08′54″N 73°49′58″W

Geography
- Location within New York Adirondack Park Location within the United States
- Location: Keene, Essex County, New York
- Parent range: Great Range
- Topo map: USGS Keene Valley

Climbing
- First ascent: 1875 by Ed Phelps
- Easiest route: Hike

Lower Wolfjaw Mountain is a mountain in the Great Range of the Adirondack Mountains in the U.S. state of New York. It is the 30th-highest of the Adirondack High Peaks, with an elevation of 4,185 feet (1,276 m). It is located in the town of Keene in Essex County. Landscape artist Alexander Helwig Wyant named the mountain, in combination with neighboring Upper Wolfjaw Mountain, for their appearance in profile c. 1870. The first recorded ascent of the mountain was made in 1875 by trail guide Ed Phelps. Upper Wolfjaw Mountain is flanked to the southwest by Lower Wolfjaw Mountain, and to the northeast by Hedgehog Mountain.

A hike of the entire Great Range crosses over the summit of Lower Wolfjaw. The mountain can also be reached on the ADK Range Trail, which begins at the DEC Interior Outpost on the Phelps Trail. The Phelps Trail begins at the Garden Parking Lot on New York State Route 73 and continues 3.1 miles (5.0 km) to the DEC Interior Outpost. The Range Trail diverges here and continues 2.0 miles (3.2 km) to the notch between Upper and Lower Wolfjaw Mountains. The trail splits between the two summits, and the left fork continues 0.5 miles (0.80 km) to the summit of Lower Wolfjaw Mountain. On the northwestern slope of the mountain, there are several rock slides which can be climbed, including the Bennies Root Canal slide and Khyber's slide.

== See also ==
- List of mountains in New York
- Northeast 111 4,000-footers
- Adirondack High Peaks
- Adirondack Forty-Sixers
