= Great Range =

Mountain range in NY state, United States

Coordinates: 44.12°N 73.87°W

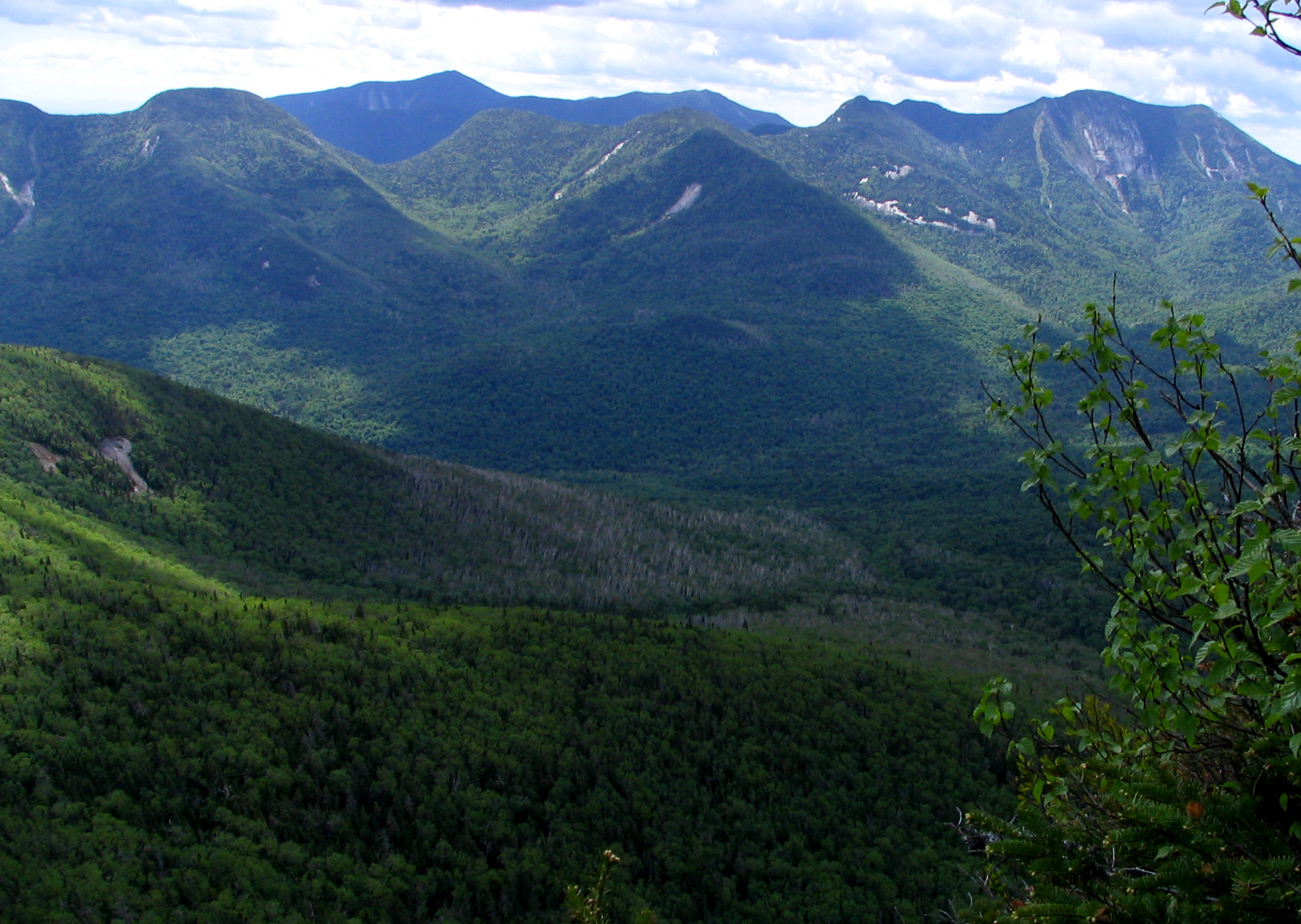
The Great Range, as seen from Big Slide: Lower Wolfjaw, Upper Wolfjaw, Armstrong, and Gothics

The Great Range is a mountain range in the Adirondack Mountains, near Keene Valley, New York, United States. It rises in the heart of the High Peaks region between Ausable Lakes to the southeast and the Johns Brook Valley to the northwest.

The range is approximately 12 miles (19 km) long and includes seven of the forty-six High Peaks. They are, along the main ridge from northeast to southwest, Lower Wolfjaw, Upper Wolfjaw, Armstrong, Gothics, Saddleback, Basin, and Haystack. Sawteeth is a spur of Gothics, and Marcy is often associated with the Great Range but it is not a "historical" part of the Great Range.

The entire range can be hiked on six maintained trails, and is considered a premier challenge for hikers in the Adirondacks. From the Rooster Comb trailhead at the northeast end of the range, the Rooster Comb Trail, Hedgehog Mountain Trail, W. A. White Trail, ADK Range Trail, and State Range Trail travel along the ridges between the peaks. The State Range Trail continues southwest to Haystack and Marcy. The total distance to Mt. Marcy is 13.5 miles (21.7 km). A side trip to Rooster Comb can be made which adds an additional mile of distance. There are no lean-tos and only a single campsite on the route.
