= Gothics =

Mountain in New York, United States

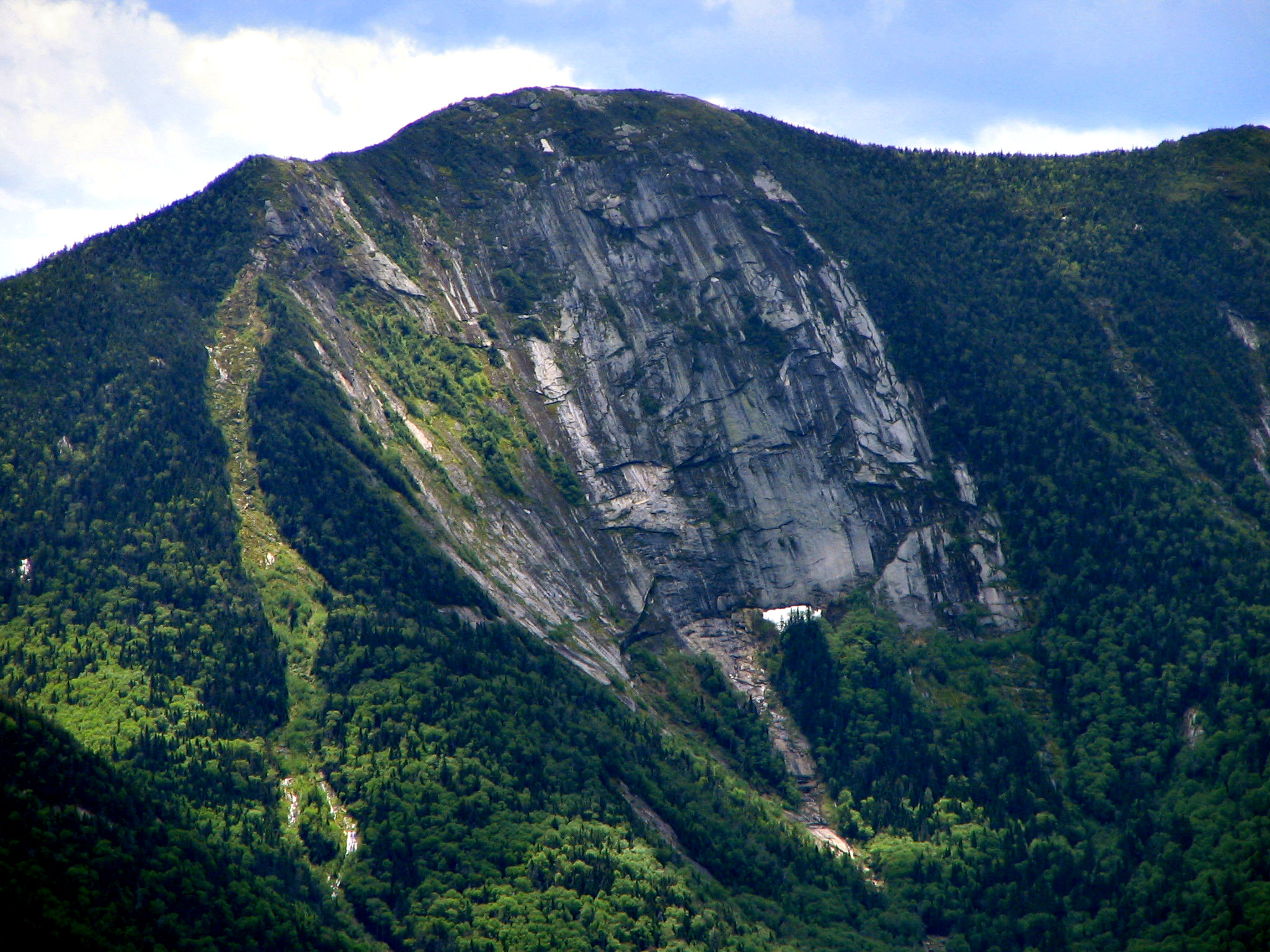
- Gothics from Big Slide Mountain

Highest point
- Elevation: 4,736 ft (1,444 m)
- Listing: #10 Adirondack High Peaks
- Coordinates: 44°07′41″N 73°51′26″W

Geography
- Location within New York Adirondack Park Location within the United States
- Location: Keene, New York, U.S.
- Parent range: Great Range
- Topo map: USGS Keene Valley

Climbing
- First ascent: October 11, 1875, by Verplanck Colvin, Roderick L. McKenzie, and Ed Phelps
- Easiest route: Hike

Gothics is a mountain in the Great Range of the Adirondacks in the U.S. state of New York. It is the tenth-highest peak in New York, with an elevation of 4,736 feet (1,444 m), and one of the 46 High Peaks in Adirondack Park. It is located in the town of Keene in Essex County. The mountain is named due to the resemblance of its three arched peaks and large rock slides to Gothic architecture. Although the name has been attributed to Orson Schofield Phelps and Frederick W. Perkins, who named several peaks during an 1857 ascent of Mount Marcy, other evidence shows the name Gothics in use at least as early as 1850. The earliest recorded ascent was made on October 11, 1875, by Verplanck Colvin, Roderick L. McKenzie, and Ed Phelps, although an unrecorded ascent was likely made earlier by James J. Storrow and Orlando Beede. The summit of Gothics is an alpine tundra zone, and on clear days views of 30 nearby peaks are available, as well as the Upper and Lower Ausable Lakes.

The ADK Range Trail crosses the summit of Gothics, and can be reached from several other trails which intersect with it. The most direct route is on the Orebed Brook Trail, which begins at John Brook Lodge and reaches a junction with the ADK Range Trail and State Range Trail at the col between Saddleback Mountain and Gothics. The total distance from Johns Brook Lodge to the summit is 3.7 miles (6.0 km), for an elevation gain of 2,360 feet (720 m). The mountain can also be approached from Lower Ausable Lake on two trails. The Beaver Meadow Trail, which begins at the Lake Road Trail, intersects the ADK Range Trail shortly before the summit, for a total distance of 5.8 miles (9.3 km) and 3,050 feet (930 m) of ascent. The Pyramid-Gothics Trail reaches the summit by crossing over Pyramid Peak, one of the two lower peaks on the mountain. The top of Pyramid Peak offers additional views of the surrounding mountains. This route is 6.6 miles (10.6 km) and involves 2,870 feet (870 m) of ascent. Both trails begin on a private game reserve, and dogs are not permitted. The mountain can also be climbed as part of a hike of the entire Great Range, following the ADK Range Trail and other trails.

== Gallery ==
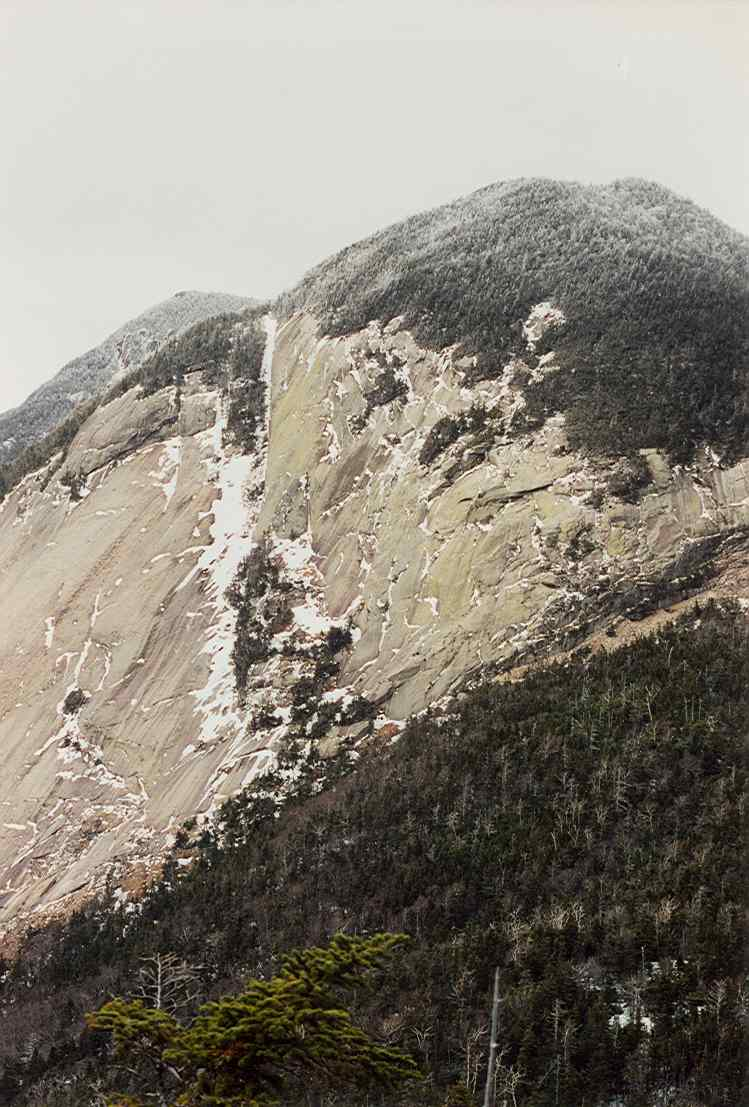
Gothics flank

Gothics as seen from Haystack, with Giant in the background.

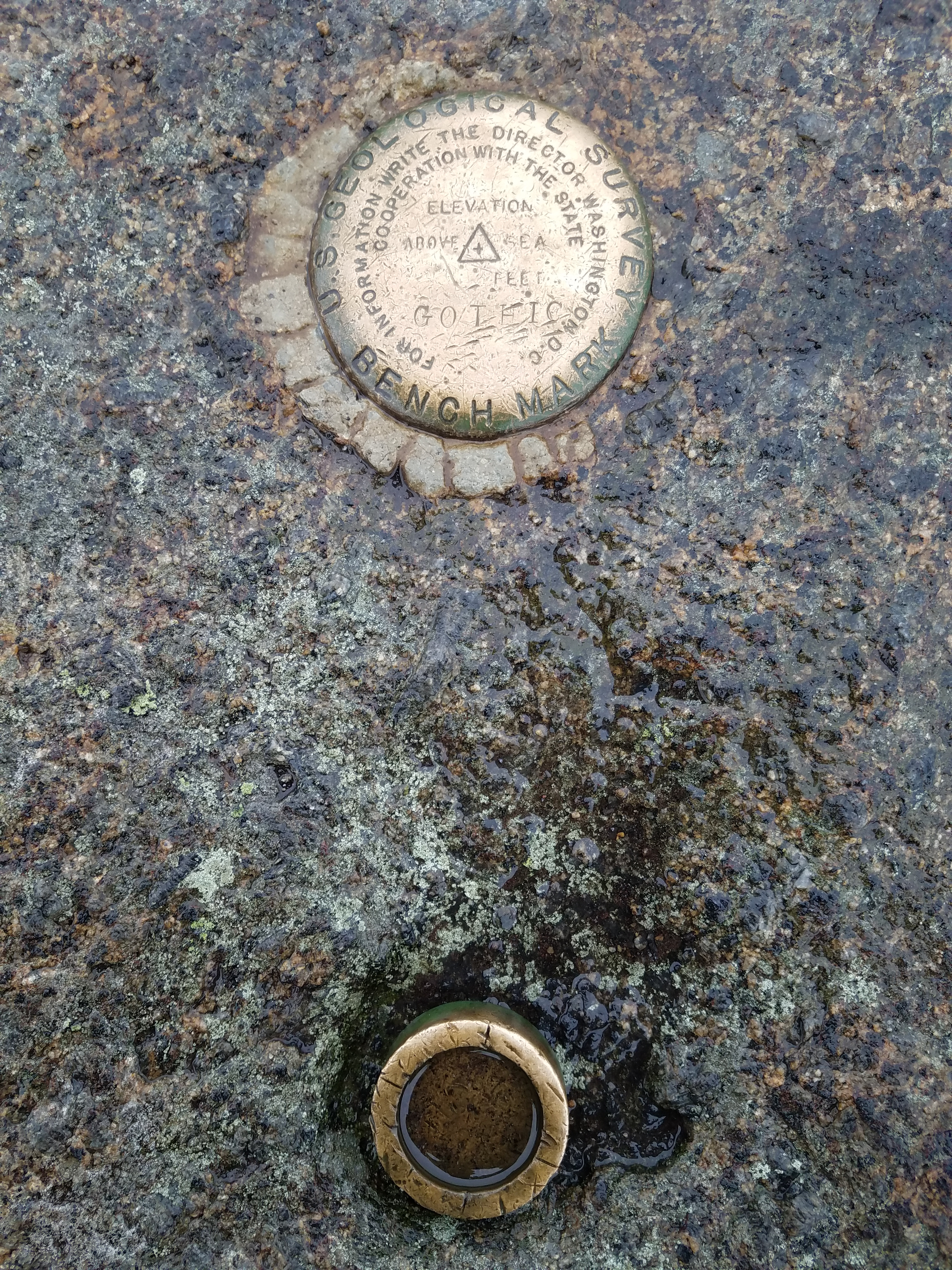
Benchmarks of Gothics Peak
