= Keene, New York =

Town in New York, United States

- Town
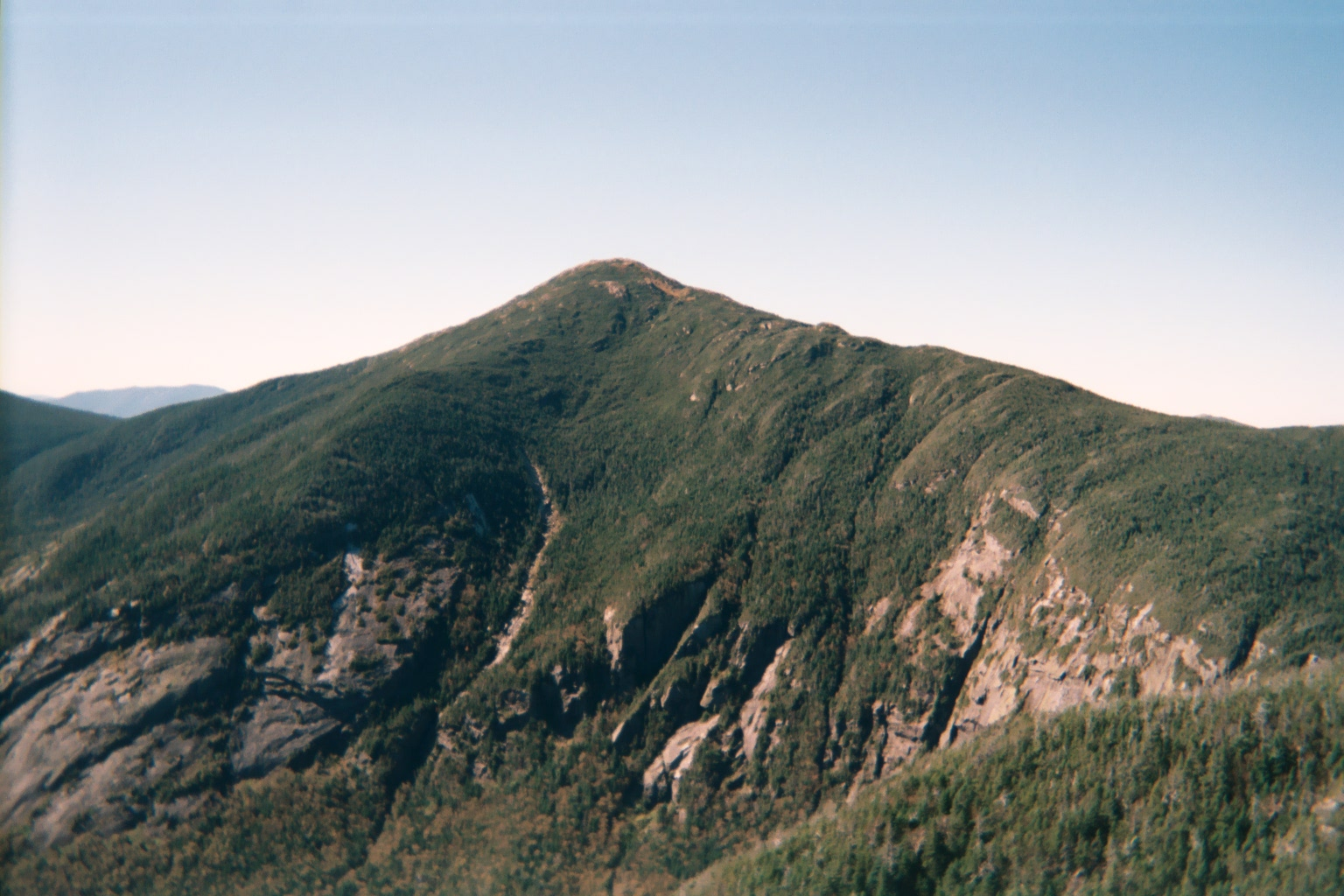
- Mount Marcy from Mount Haystack

- Location in Essex County and the state of New York
- Coordinates: 44°15′22″N 73°47′32″W
- Country: United States
- State: New York
- County: Essex
- Established: 1808

Government
  - Type: Town Council
  - Town Supervisor: Joe Pete Wilson [D]
  - Town Council: Members' List: • Robert M. Biesemeyer; • Teresa Cheetham-Palen; • David R. Deyo; • Jennifer G. Whitney

Area
  - Total: 156.62 sq mi (405.64 km^{2})
  - Land: 155.94 sq mi (403.89 km^{2})
  - Water: 0.68 sq mi (1.75 km^{2})
- Elevation: 1,358 ft (414 m)

Population (2020)
  - Total: 1,144
  - Density: 7.3/sq mi (2.83/km^{2})
- Time zone: UTC−5 (Eastern (EST))
  - Summer (DST): UTC−4 (EDT)
- ZIP Codes: 12942 (Keene); 12943 (Keene Valley); 12941 (Jay)
- Area code: 518
- FIPS code: 36-031-39067
- GNIS feature ID: 0979113
- Website: www.townofkeeneny.com

Keene is a town in central Essex County, New York, United States. It includes the hamlets of Keene, Keene Valley, and St. Huberts, with a total population of 1,144 as of the 2020 census

The town is part of the Adirondack Park, and includes 15 of the 46 High Peaks, including Mount Marcy, New York's highest mountain, and the rest of the Great Range. It also includes the Ausable Lakes, the source of the Ausable River. Trailheads for many of the High Peaks are located within the town, along with the Johns Brook Lodge of the Adirondack Mountain Club.

== History ==
The earliest settlement in the present village of Keene Center was in 1787. The town of Keene was created from splitting parts of the towns of Jay and Elizabethtown on March 19, 1808. This originally included current North Elba, but that was split in 1849 from the original Keene. The area is mountainous with bedrock close to the surface in most areas, leaving little arable land. It has a low population due to the unsuitable and often unstable soil in the region. A road along the Ausable River from Jay was extended south to Keene Center about 1797, but it was often deemed almost impassible due to the structure of the area. The town of Keene organized the first school district in the Adirondacks, which held its first recorded trustee meeting in 1813.

Early development in the area was based on lumber and iron extraction; however, exporting lumber was difficult due to lack of transportation, and most was used locally. The first sawmill was built in 1823 and was quickly followed by forges and gristmills. The riverbed region of Keene sprouted the first community, Keene Central, and Keene Flats (renamed Keene Valley in 1883) was developed by 1840. In 1892, after the Adirondack Mountain Reserve acquired the land, a privately tolled and maintained road to Lower Ausable Lake was constructed.

In 2011, the town completed a grassroots project to bring broadband service to more than 97% of the homes in Keene, and installing the service in every home with a student in the town's public school. The extension of this network into rural areas makes it unique in the Adirondack Park.

The Hurricane Mountain Fire Observation Station, Slater Bridge (St. Huberts) and Walton Bridge are listed on the National Register of Historic Places.

== Geography ==
According to the United States Census Bureau, the town has a total area of 156.6 square miles (405.6 km^{2}), of which 155.9 square miles (403.9 km^{2}) is land and 0.69 square miles (1.8 km^{2}), or 0.43%, is water.

Many of the High Peaks of the Adirondack Park are in or near the town, including Mount Marcy, elevation 5,343 feet (1,629 m), the highest point in New York. The Garden, one of the most popular trailheads in the Adirondacks, is located in the hamlet of Keene Valley and is the eastern end of the Johns Brook Trail, leading to Johns Brook Lodge, Mount Marcy, and the heart of the High Peaks Region.

The Lower Ausable Lake and the northern half of the Upper Ausable Lake are in the town of Keene. The East Branch of the Ausable River flows north out of the Lower Ausable Lake and passes through the hamlets of St. Huberts, Keene Valley and Keene before entering the Town of Jay. The Hull's Falls cascade near Keene is a local scenic site.

New York State Route 9N changes from north–south to east–west south of Keene hamlet, at the foot of Spruce Hill. New York State Route 73 changes from east–west to north–south just north of the hamlet of Keene.

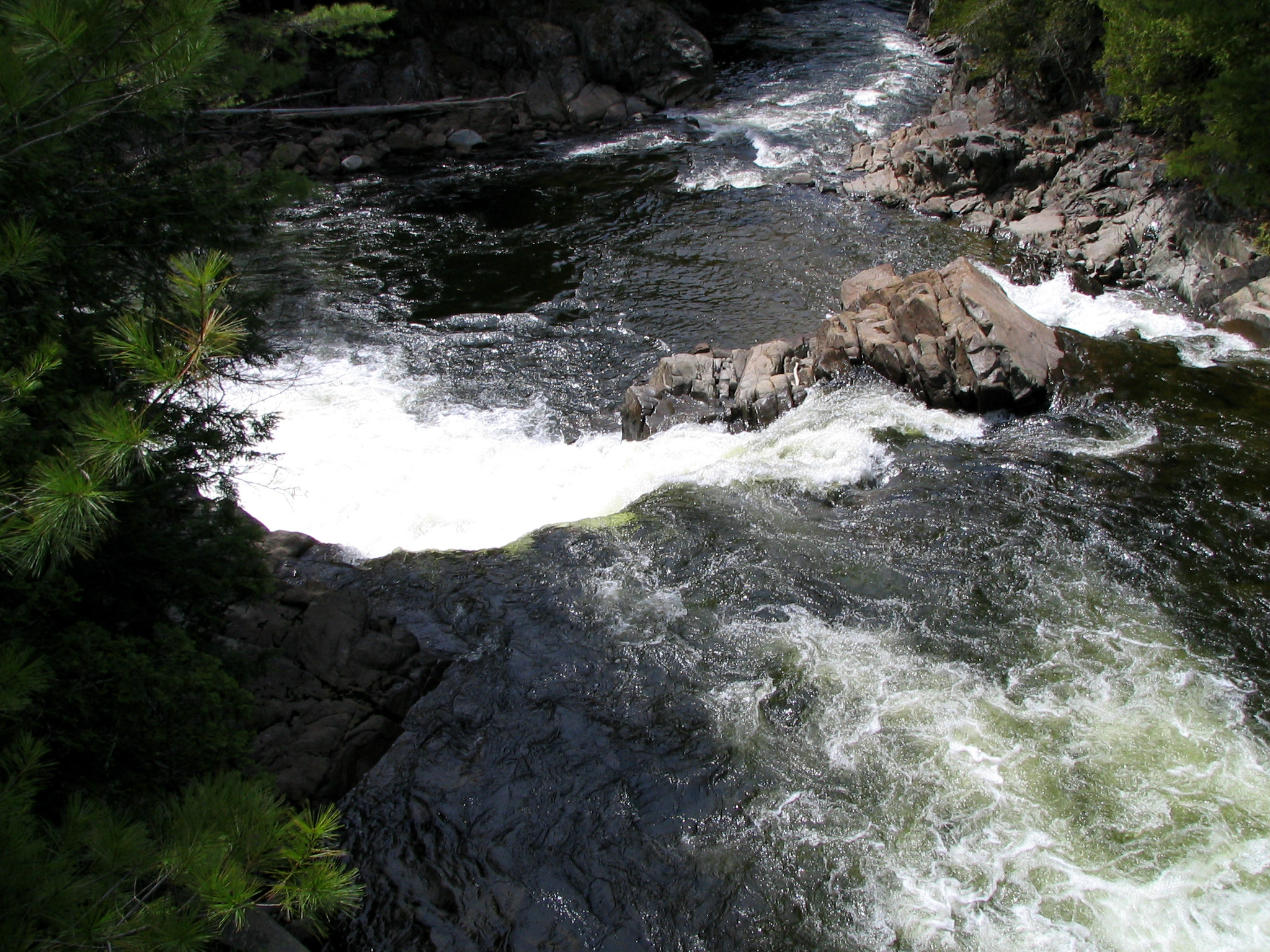
Hull's Falls, Ausable River

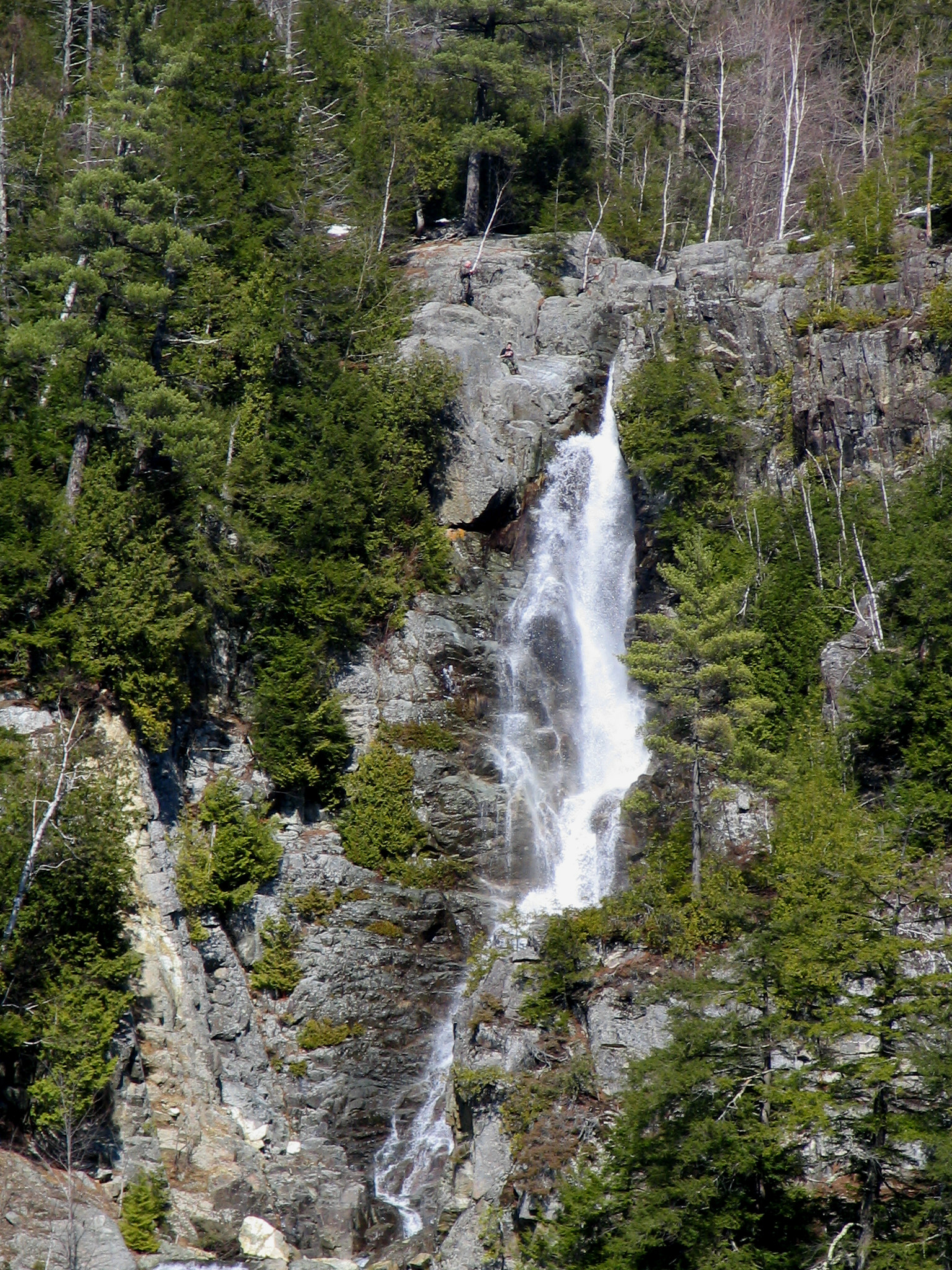
Roaring Brook Falls, on the Giant Mountain trail, near St. Huberts

== Demographics ==
Historical population
Census	Pop.	Note	%±
1820	605		—
1830	787		30.1%
1840	730		−7.2%
1850	756		3.6%
1860	784		3.7%
1870	720		−8.2%
1880	910		26.4%
1890	1,258		38.2%
1900	1,394		10.8%
1910	1,227		−12.0%
1920	1,032		−15.9%
1930	1,001		−3.0%
1940	1,060		5.9%
1950	938		−11.5%
1960	726		−22.6%
1970	763		5.1%
1980	919		20.4%
1990	908		−1.2%
2000	1,063		17.1%
2010	1,105		4.0%
2020	1,144		3.5%
U.S. Decennial Census

As of the census of 2000, there were 1,063 people, 443 households, and 279 families residing in the town. The population density was 6.8 inhabitants per square mile (2.6/km^{2}). There were 984 housing units at an average density of 6.3 per square mile (2.4/km^{2}). The racial makeup of the town was 98.68% White, 0.09% African American, 0.19% Native American, 0.47% Asian, 0.09% from other races, and 0.47% from two or more races. Hispanic or Latino of any race were 0.38% of the population.

There were 443 households, out of which 29.6% had children under the age of 18 living with them, 53.0% were married couples living together, 6.3% had a female householder with no husband present, and 37.0% were non-families. Of all households, 31.4% were made up of individuals, and 13.5% had someone living alone who was 65 years of age or older. The average household size was 2.30 and the average family size was 2.90.

The population distribution by age was as follows: 21.8% under 18 years old; 5.9% between 18 and 24 years old, 22.3% between 25 and 44 years old, 30.4% from 45 to 64 years old, and 19.6% 65 years of age or older. The median age was 45 years. For every 100 females, there were 85.8 males. For every 100 females age 18 and over, there were 85.1 males.

The median income for a household in the town was $34,226, and the median income for a family was $44,250. Males had a median income of $35,417 versus $22,083 for females. The per capita income for the town was $17,037. About 1.4% of families and 4.7% of the population were below the poverty line, including none of those under age 18 and 5.1% of those age 65 or over.

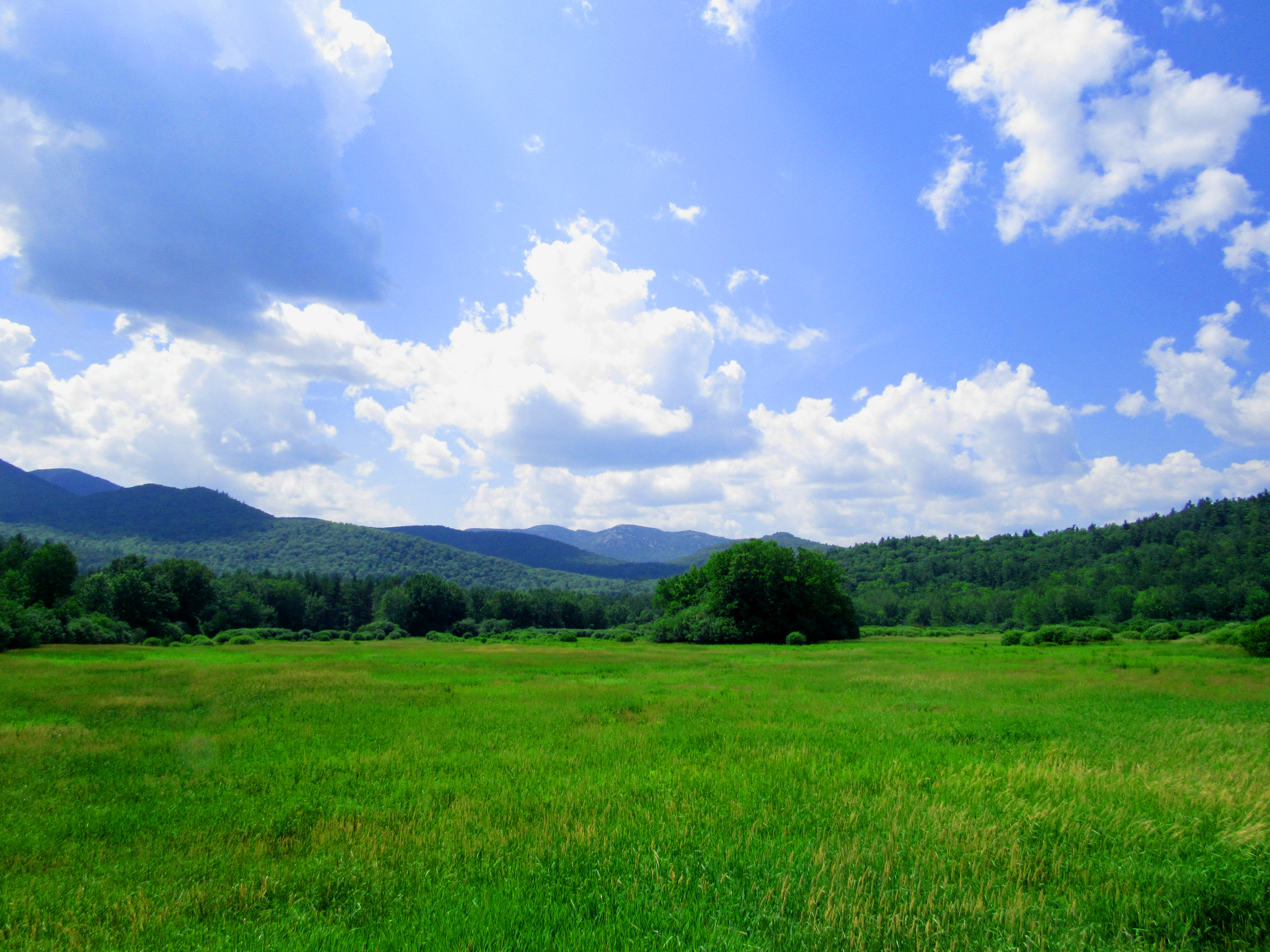
Scenic view from Route 73 in Keene, NY.

== Communities and locations in Keene ==
- Adirondack Mountain Reserve: ~7,000 acres of public-access private-wilderness, protected prior to the creation of the Adirondack Park
- Ausable Club: late Victorian Queen Anne stick-style hotel, added to the National Register of Historic Places in 2005.
- Cascade: A former community in the western part of Keene.
- Glenmore: A former hamlet east of Keene hamlet, located on County Road 13.
- The Great Range: A 10-mile-long (16 km) mountain range that includes seven of the 46 Adirondack High Peaks.
- Keene (formerly "Keene Center"): A hamlet in the north-central part of the town on Routes NY-73 and NY-9N.
- Keene Valley (formerly "Keene Flats"): A hamlet south of Keene hamlet on NY-73. The Beer's Bridge, Keene Valley Library, Notman Bridge, and Ranney Bridge are listed on the National Register of Historic Places.
- Mount Marcy: The highest peak in the state is in the western part of the town, southwest of Keene Valley and St. Huberts.
- St. Huberts: A hamlet in the southern part of the town on NY-73. Slater Bridge (Maghee Bridge) over the Ausable River is listed on the National Register of Historic Places. Putnam Camp was added to the National Register of Historic Places in 2012.
- Lower Ausable Lake: A lake in the southwestern part of Keene.
- Upper Ausable Lake: A lake partly in the town at the southern town line.

== Notable person ==
- Russell Banks, novelist
