= Wright Peak =

Mountain in New York, United States

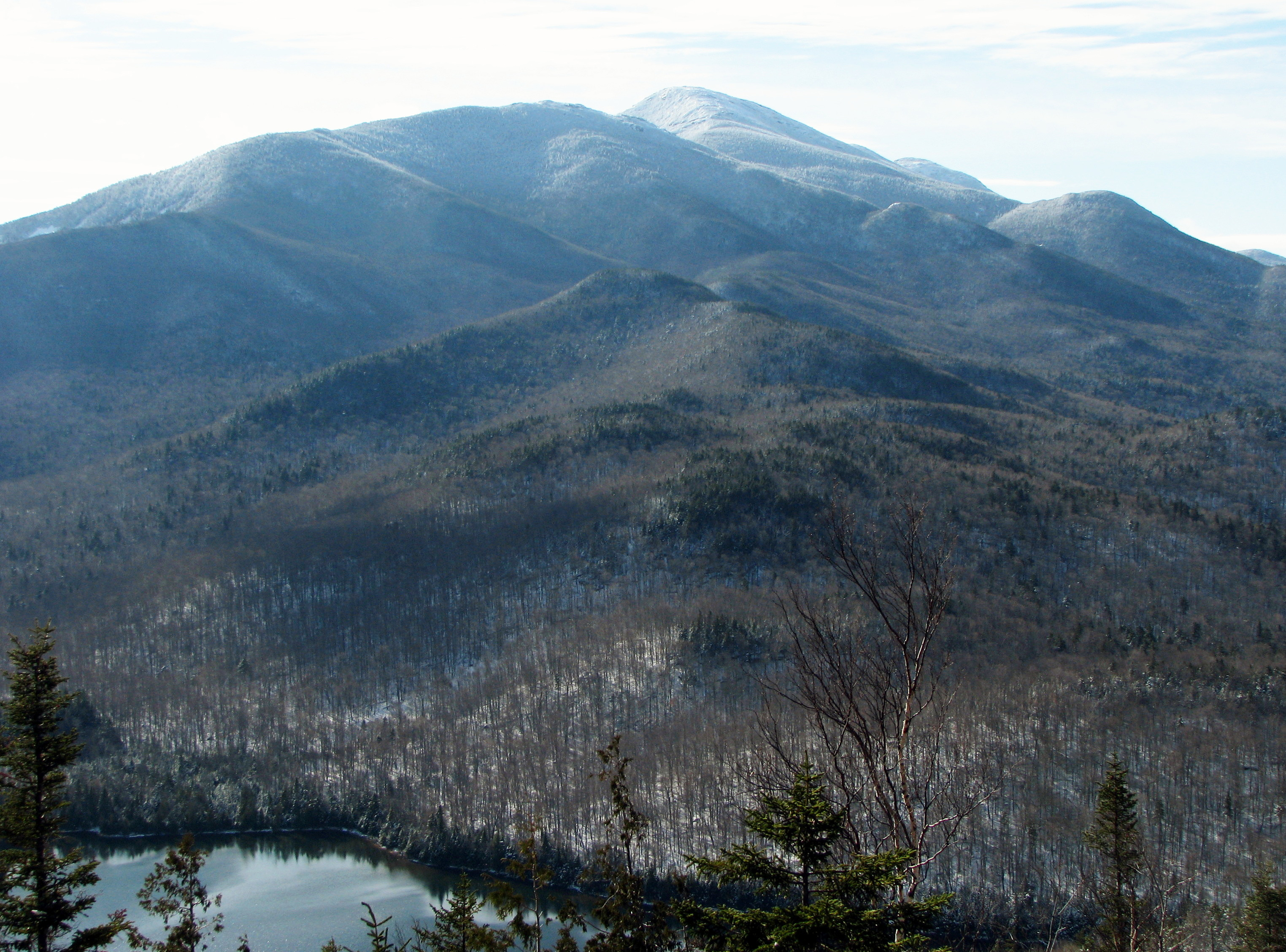
- Wright Peak from Mount Jo, Heart Lake, lower left, Algonquin, behind at right

Highest point
- Elevation: 4,580 ft (1,400 m) NGVD 29
- Listing: Adirondack High Peaks 16th
- Coordinates: 44°09′06″N 73°58′49″W

Geography
- Location within New York Adirondack Park Location within the United States
- Location: North Elba, New York, U.S.
- Parent range: MacIntyre Range
- Topo map: USGS Keene Valley

Climbing
- First ascent: August 1893 by Charles H. Peck and Charles Wood
- Easiest route: Hike from the Adirondak Loj

Wright Peak is a mountain in the MacIntyre Range of the Adirondacks in the U.S. state of New York. It is the 16th-highest of the 46 Adirondack High Peaks, with an elevation of 4,580 feet (1,400 m). It is located in the town of North Elba in Essex County. The peak is named after Silas Wright, a New York senator and governor. The mountain is popular for back-country skiing in the winter and features trails to the summit as well as long landslides on its slopes.

== History ==
The mountain was named by surveyor Verplanck Colvin for former governor Silas Wright in 1873. Earlier references exist to a "Mount Wright" in the Adirondacks, but did not record if the name referred to the same peak. The earliest recorded ascent was made in 1893 by state botanist Charles H. Peck and guide Charles Wood.

On January 16, 1962, a B-47 aircraft from Plattsburgh Air Force Base crashed into Wright Peak during a training mission, killing all four crewmen. Their training mission involved practicing low bombing runs over Watertown, New York. Due to inclement weather, the bomber veered about 30 miles (48 km) off course, and into the High Peaks region. The aircraft made its impact just below the summit of Wright Peak. Due to severe winter weather, which left snow drifts of 10–18 feet (3.0–5.5 m) on the mountain and produced wind gusts of over 50 miles per hour (80 km/h), the search and rescue mission which followed took weeks to identify and retrieve the wreckage and bodies of the airmen. Pieces of the wreckage can still be found on the summit, and a plaque commemorating the event has been installed nearby.

== Geography ==
Wright Peak is the northernmost major peak of the MacIntyre Range. On its northeastern slope is a shorter peak known as the Whale's Tail. The other peaks of the MacIntyre Range, Algonquin Peak, Boundary Peak, Iroquois Peak, and Mount Marshall, are located to the southeast. The summit of the mountain lies above the treeline. On the southeastern slopes of the mountain are two landslides known as the Left Wing and Right Wing slides after their relation to the wreckage of the crashed B-47 near the summit. Three additional slides, known as the Angel slides, formed more recently on the northeastern slopes.

== Ascent routes ==
An approach to Wright Peak can be made from the Adirondak Loj, heading on the Van Hoevenberg Trail to an intersection with the yellow-blazed trail to Algonquin Peak. The yellow trail proceeds uphill to an intersection with the blue-blazed trail for Wright Peak, 3.4 miles (5.5 km) from the Loj. After a left turn the blue-blazed trail proceeds the final 0.4 miles (0.64 km) and up the last few hundred feet of elevation through the alpine zone, for a total one-way distance of 3.8 miles (6.1 km) and an ascent of 2,400 feet (730 m).

Skiing on Wright Peak is popular in the winter. The first ski trail on the mountain was constructed in 1938. Avalanches have been recorded on the mountain during the ski season. A 2000 avalanche on Wright resulted in the only recorded fatality in the Adirondacks. Several skiers have been partially buried by subsequent avalanches but have self-rescued in all cases.

== Gallery ==
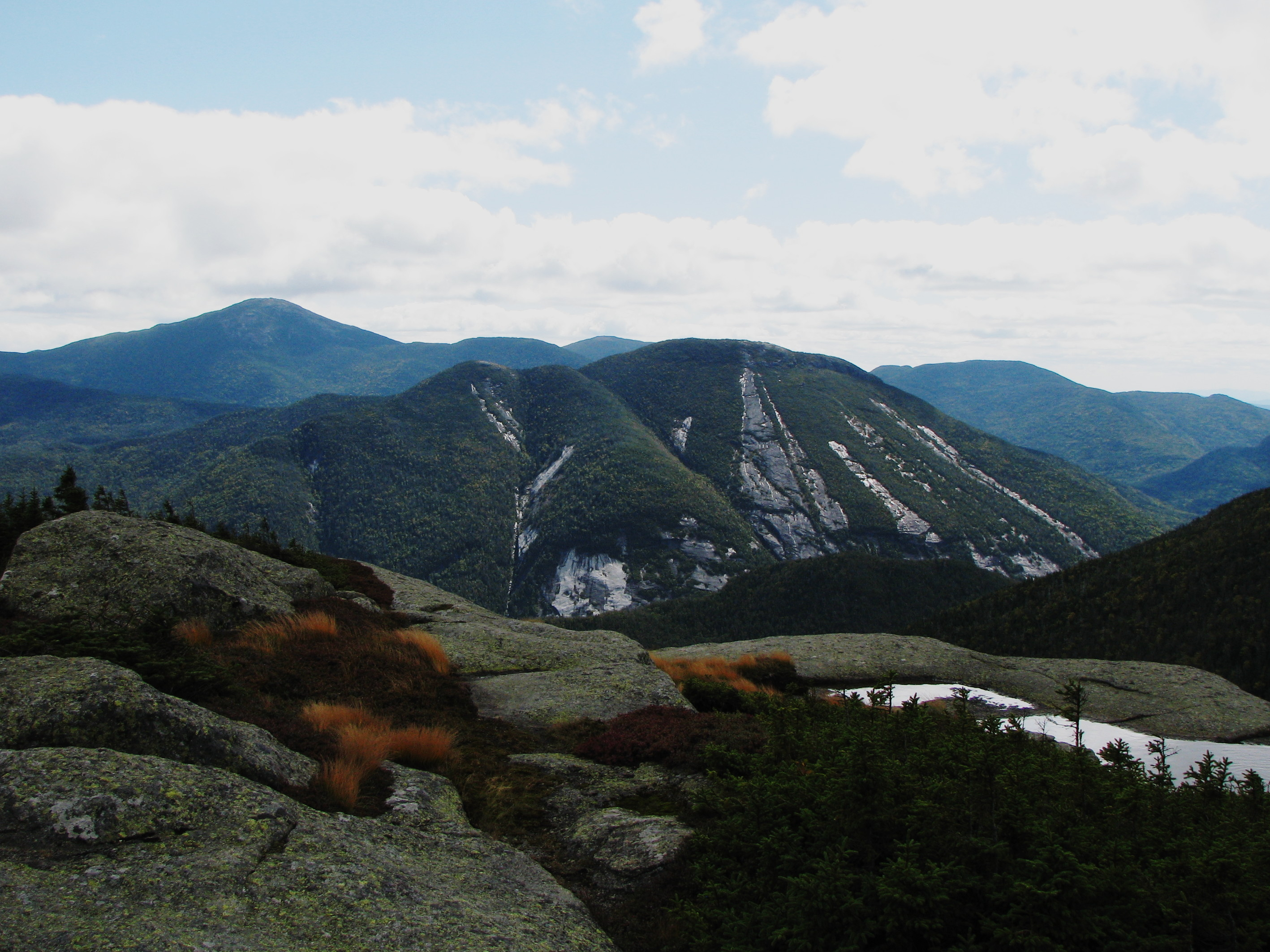
Mount Colden from Wright, Marcy at left

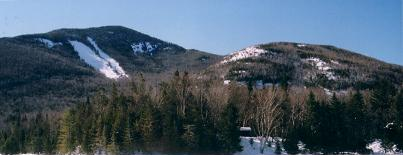
Wright Peak as seen from Marcy Dam

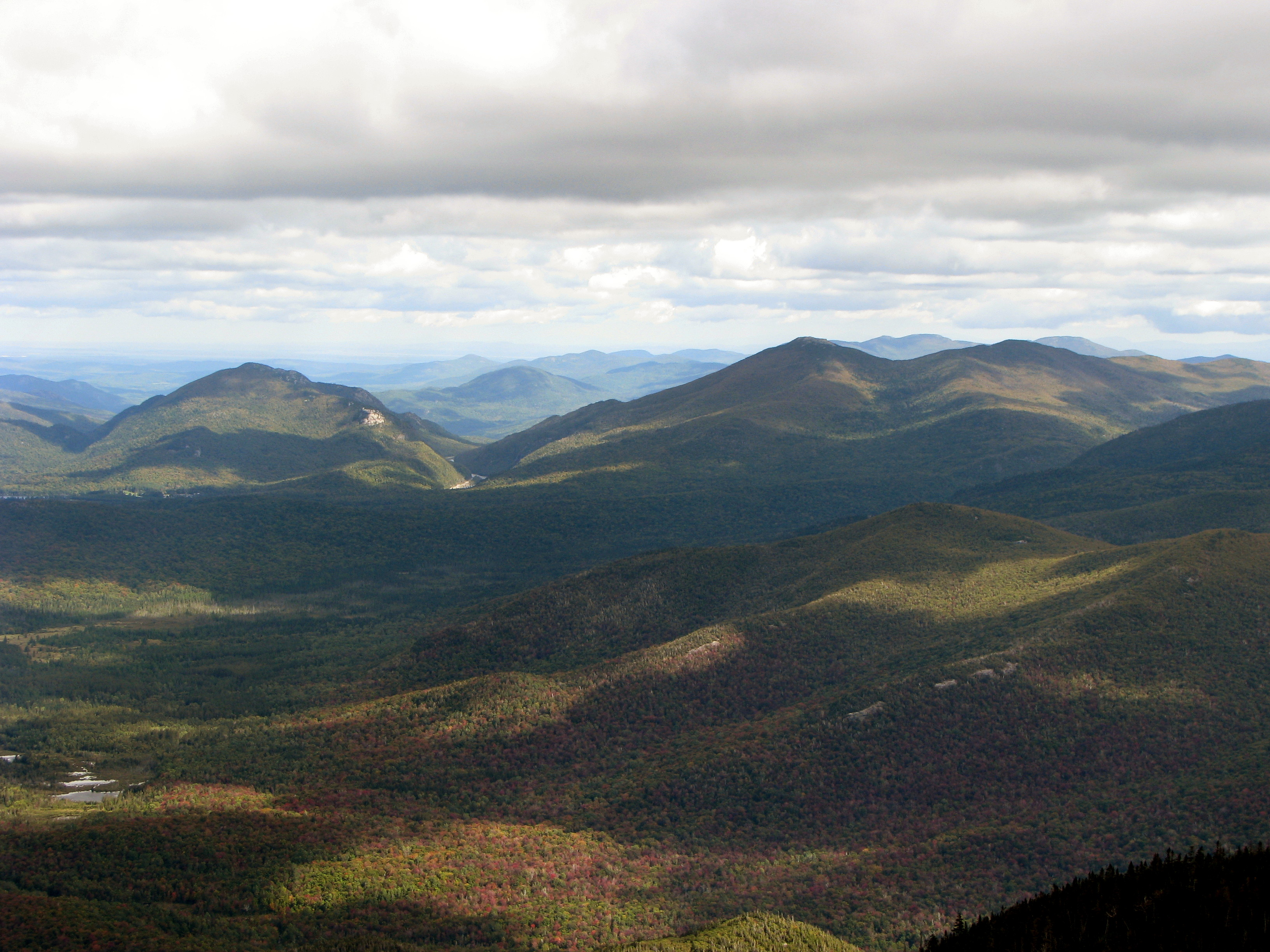
Pitchoff, Cascade and Porter, from Wright
