= Table Top Mountain (New York) =

Mountain in New York, United States

Table Top Mountain (south peak)
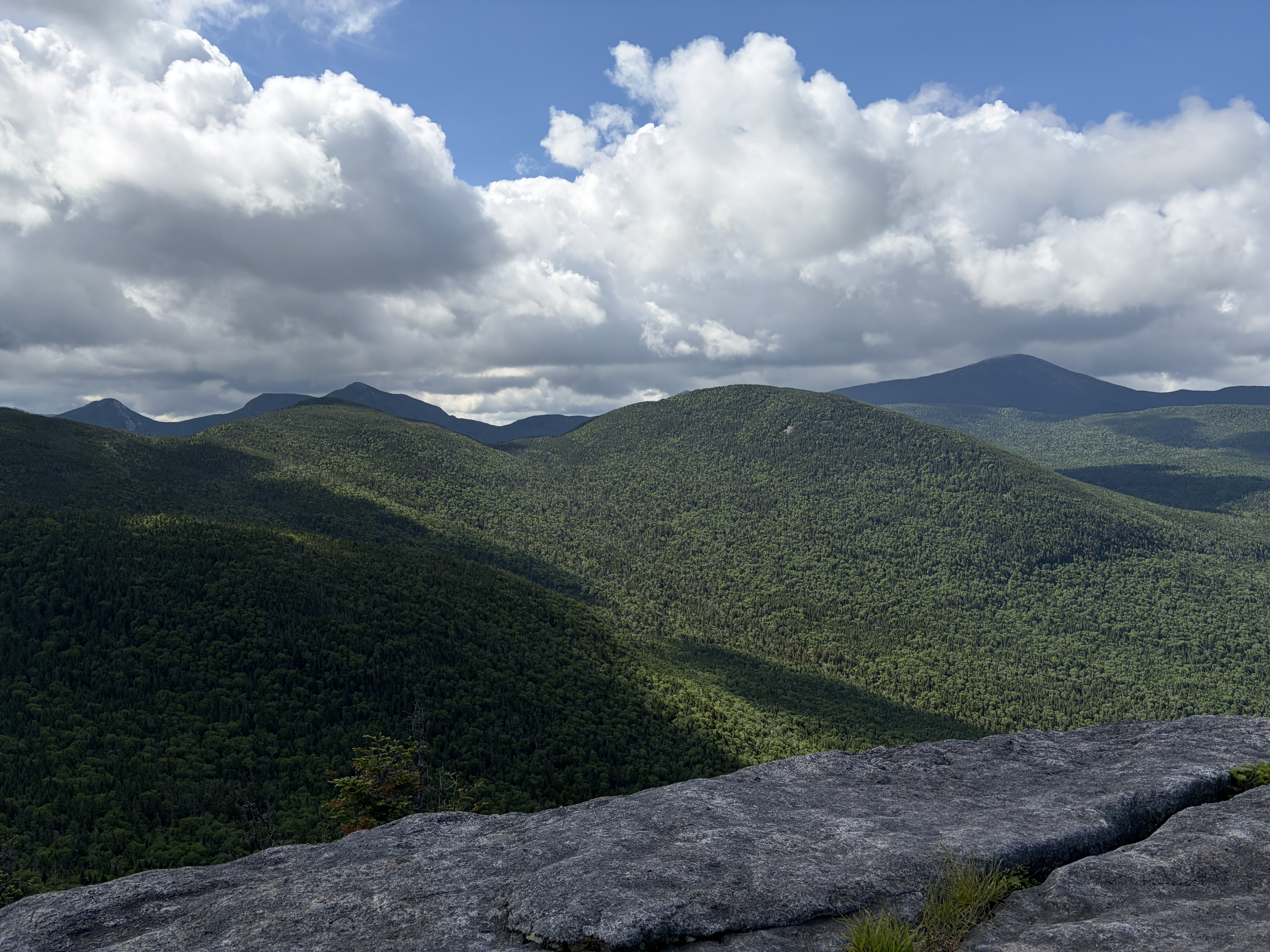
- Table Top (true summit at right, in front of Mount Marcy in the background) viewed from Phelps Mountain

Highest point
- Elevation: 4,427 ft (1,349 m) NGVD 29
- Listing: Adirondack High Peaks 19th
- Coordinates: 44°8.44′N 73°54.98′W

Geography
- Location within New York Adirondack Park Location within the United States
- Location: Keene, Essex County, New York
- Parent range: Adirondack Mountains
- Topo map: USGS Keene Valley

Climbing
- First ascent: 1911, by Jim Suitor
- Easiest route: Hike

Table Top Mountain is a mountain in the Adirondacks in the U.S. state of New York. It is the 19th-highest of the Adirondack High Peaks, with an elevation of 4,427 feet (1,349 m). It is located in the town of Keene in Essex County, inside Adirondack Park. The name "Table Top" first appeared in print in 1876, referring to its appearance. The earliest recorded ascent of the mountain was made in 1911 by Jim Suitor, a cruiser for the J. & J. Rogers Company while it performed logging operations on the mountain.

The summit of Table Top Mountain can be reached on an unmarked trail, which branches off from the Van Hoevenberg Trail 4.4 miles (7.1 km) from the Adirondack Loj and 50 yards (46 m) from an intersection with a ski trail. The unmarked trail continues up the mountain for 0.5 miles (0.80 km). From an observation point near the summit, limited views of Mt. Marcy and other nearby peaks are available.

== See also ==
- List of mountains in New York
- Northeast 111 4,000-footers
- Adirondack High Peaks
- Adirondack Forty-Sixers
