= Algonquin Peak =

Mountain in New York state, United States

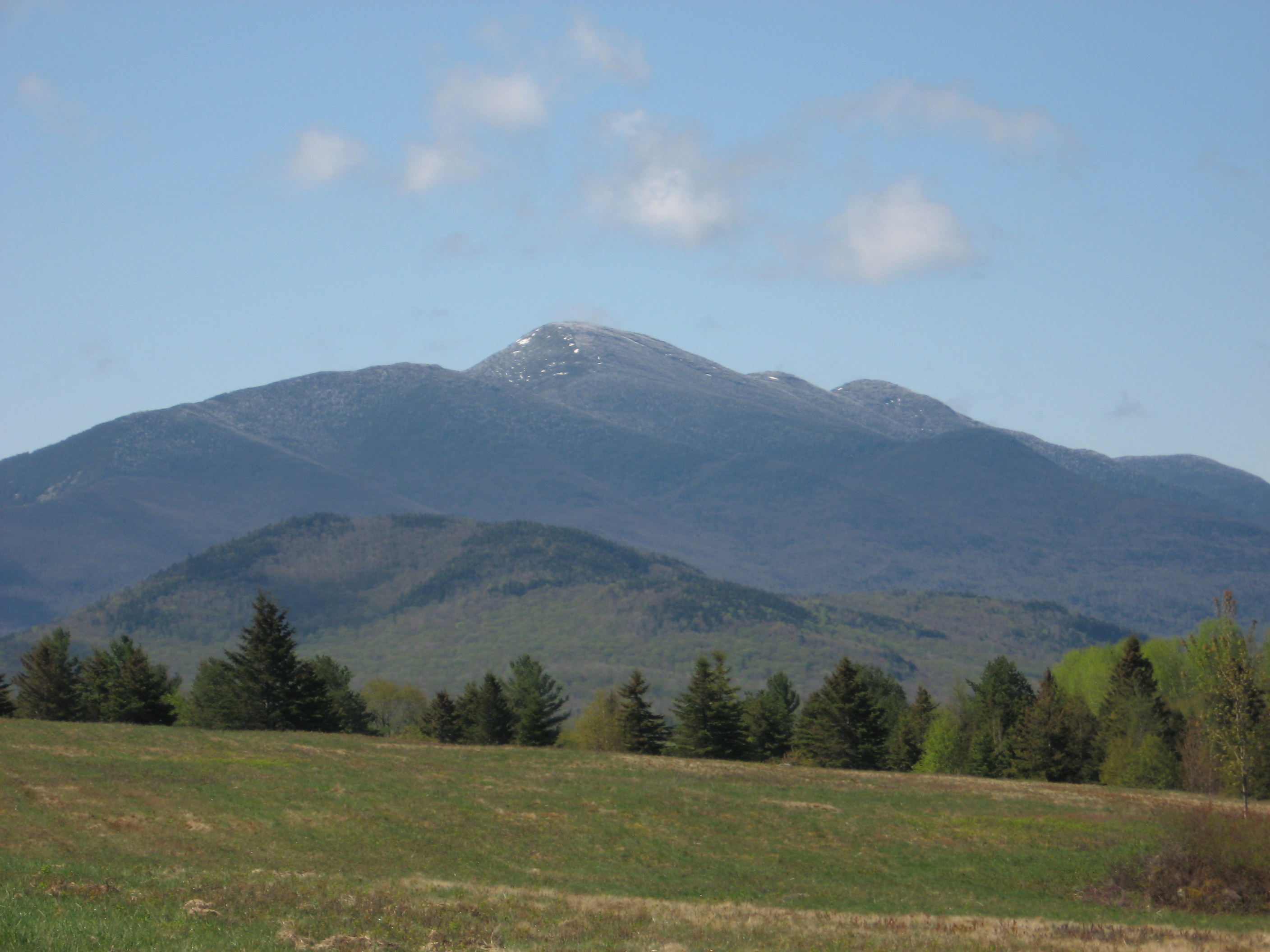
- Algonquin Peak seen from road to Adirondak Loj

Highest point
- Elevation: 5,114 ft (1,559 m) NGVD 29
- Listing: Adirondack High Peaks 2nd
- Coordinates: 44°08′37″N 73°59′12″W

Geography
- Location within New York
- Location: North Elba, New York, U.S.
- Parent range: MacIntyre Mountains
- Topo map: USGS Keene Valley

Climbing
- First ascent: August 8, 1837, by Ebenezer Emmons and party (Note: Other members of the party included his son Ebenezer Emmons Jr., scientist William Charles Redfield, assistant state geologist James Hall, artist Charles C. Ingham, state botanist John Torrey, businessman David Henderson, guides John Cheney and Harvey Holt, and three unknown guides. Surveyor Charles Brodhead crossed the lower slopes of the mountain in 1797, but it cannot be verified if he traveled to the summit.)
- Easiest route: Hike from the Adirondak Loj

Algonquin Peak is a mountain in the MacIntyre Range of the Adirondacks in the U.S. state of New York. It is the second-highest mountain in New York, with an elevation of 5,114 feet (1,559 m), and one of the 46 Adirondack High Peaks. It is located in the town of North Elba in Essex County and in the High Peaks Wilderness Area of Adirondack Park. The first recorded ascent of the mountain was made on August 8, 1837, by a party led by New York state geologist Ebenezer Emmons. It was originally named Mount McIntyre, after Archibald McIntyre, but this name was eventually applied to the entire range. Surveyor Verplanck Colvin added the name "Algonquin" in 1880. This name came from the peak reputedly being on the Algonquian side of a nearby informal boundary between the Algonquian and their Iroquois neighbors, although no such boundary existed in reality.

Algonquin Peak is accessible from two trails. Starting at the Adirondak Loj outside Lake Placid, the mountain can be approached from the north by following the blue-blazed Van Hoevenberg Trail 1.0 mile (1.6 km) to its junction with the yellow-blazed MacIntyre Range Trail. That trail continues the remaining 3.3 miles (5.3 km) to the summit, during which the route gets progressively steeper and rockier. The total distance is 4.3 miles (6.9 km) for an elevation gain of 2,936 feet (895 m). The mountain can also be approached from the southeast via an even steeper trail which begins at Lake Colden, which rises 2,350 feet (720 m) in just 2.1 miles (3.4 km). From the summit, an unmarked trail leads 1.1 miles (1.8 km) southeast to nearby Boundary Peak and Iroquois Peak. A trail to Wright Peak forks from the yellow trail 0.9 miles (1.4 km) below the summit. The mountain's summit is above tree line. Views of the surrounding peaks are available in all directions, with particularly good views available of nearby Mount Colden and Lake Colden. Algonquin is increasingly popular with hikers, with a 2021 study by Otak observing significant crowds on the summit of the mountain on popular summer days.

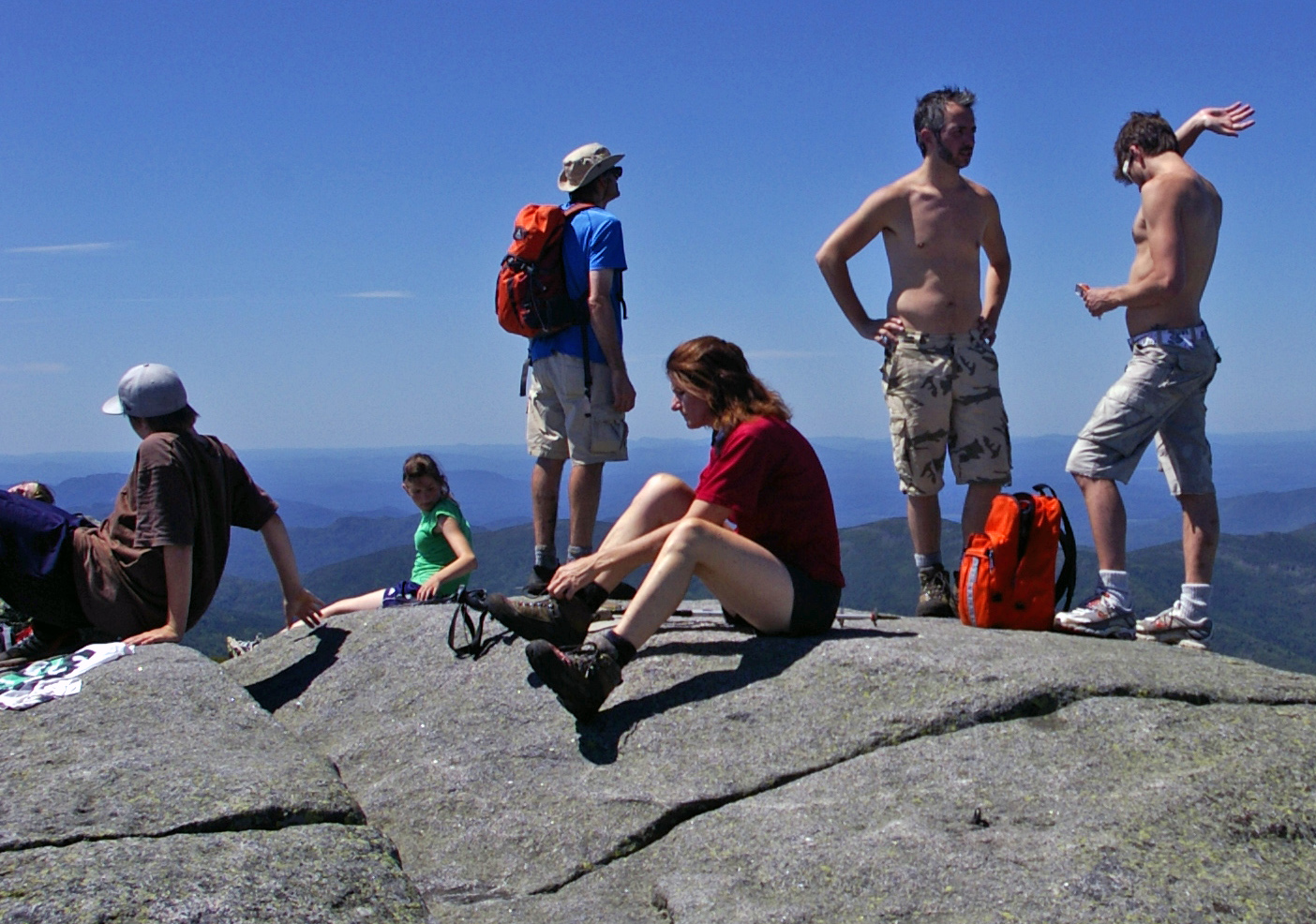
Hikers at summit

An area of 23.5 acres (9.5 ha) surrounding the summit is an alpine tundra zone, the largest found in the Adirondacks. This area is home to many arctic plants, including American dwarf birch, bearberry willow, black crowberry, Bog bilberry, Cutler's alpine goldenrod, Diapensia, Lapland rose-bay, and low rattlesnake root, and contains a prominent bog. The large numbers of hikers on the summit have in the past caused damage to the fragile plant life, and strict regulations have been put in place on the summit to protect it. Camping is prohibited above an elevation of 4,000 feet (1,200 m), hikers must remain on the trail in the alpine zone, and no dogs are allowed without a leash. The Summit Steward program places guides on Algonquin and other peaks to both remind hikers of these rules and educate them about the ecosystem.

== Climate ==
Climate data for Algonquin Peak 44.1415 N, 73.9882 W, Elevation: 4,623 ft (1,409 m) (1991–2020 normals)
Month	Jan	Feb	Mar	Apr	May	Jun	Jul	Aug	Sep	Oct	Nov	Dec	Year
Mean daily maximum °F (°C)	18.2 (−7.7)	19.6 (−6.9)	26.9 (−2.8)	42.2 (5.7)	54.6 (12.6)	63.1 (17.3)	67.3 (19.6)	66.1 (18.9)	60.5 (15.8)	47.9 (8.8)	32.6 (0.3)	23.5 (−4.7)	43.5 (6.4)
Daily mean °F (°C)	10.2 (−12.1)	11.5 (−11.4)	18.9 (−7.3)	32.2 (0.1)	45.0 (7.2)	54.2 (12.3)	58.7 (14.8)	57.5 (14.2)	51.5 (10.8)	39.4 (4.1)	26.2 (−3.2)	16.6 (−8.6)	35.2 (1.7)
Mean daily minimum °F (°C)	2.2 (−16.6)	3.4 (−15.9)	10.8 (−11.8)	22.3 (−5.4)	35.5 (1.9)	45.2 (7.3)	50.2 (10.1)	48.9 (9.4)	42.5 (5.8)	30.9 (−0.6)	19.8 (−6.8)	9.7 (−12.4)	26.8 (−2.9)
Average precipitation inches (mm)	4.70 (119)	3.56 (90)	4.39 (112)	5.21 (132)	5.62 (143)	6.81 (173)	6.23 (158)	5.83 (148)	5.62 (143)	6.35 (161)	5.07 (129)	5.10 (130)	64.49 (1,638)
Source: PRISM Climate Group

== Gallery ==
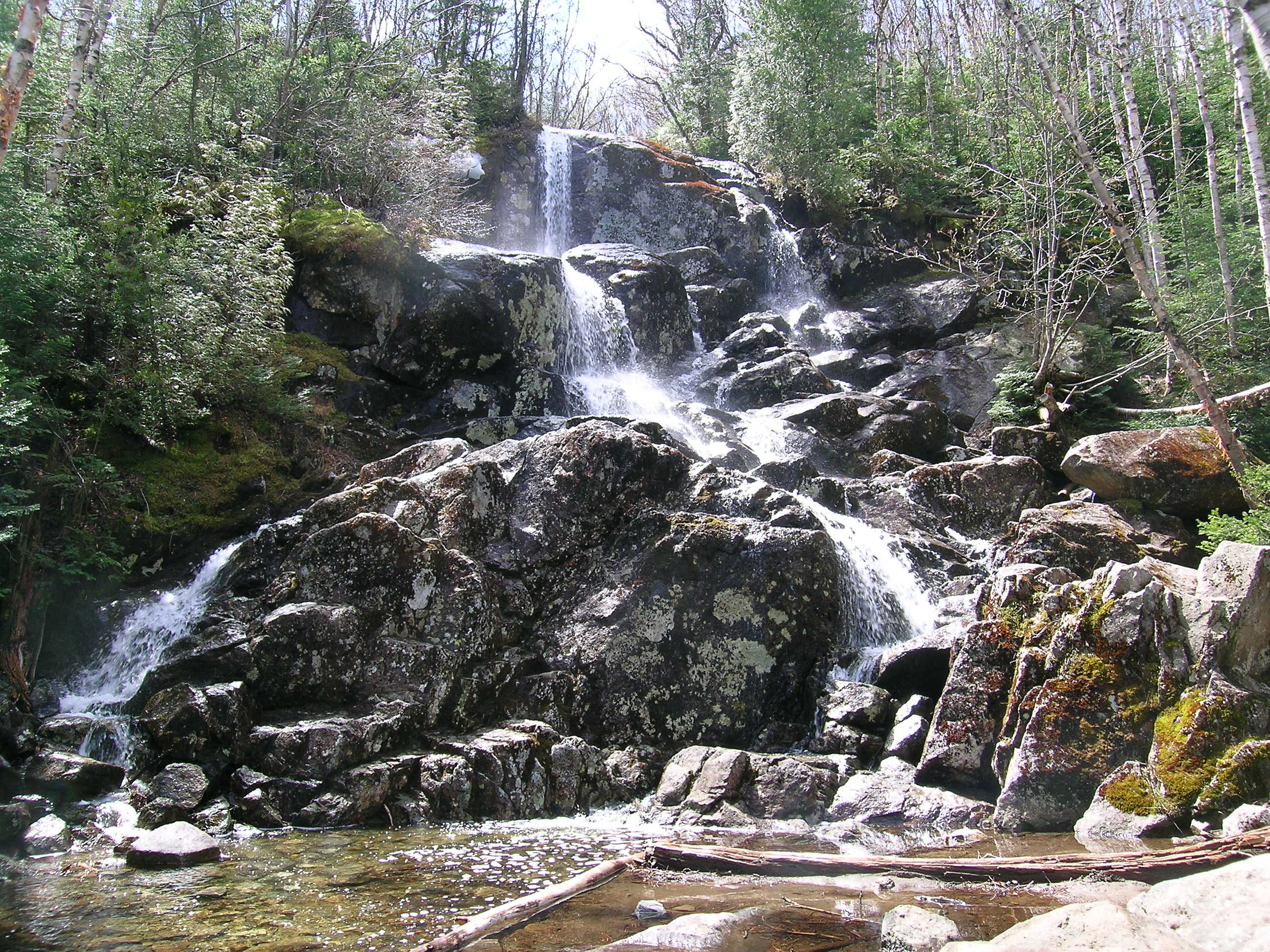
Waterfall on the trail to Algonquin Peak
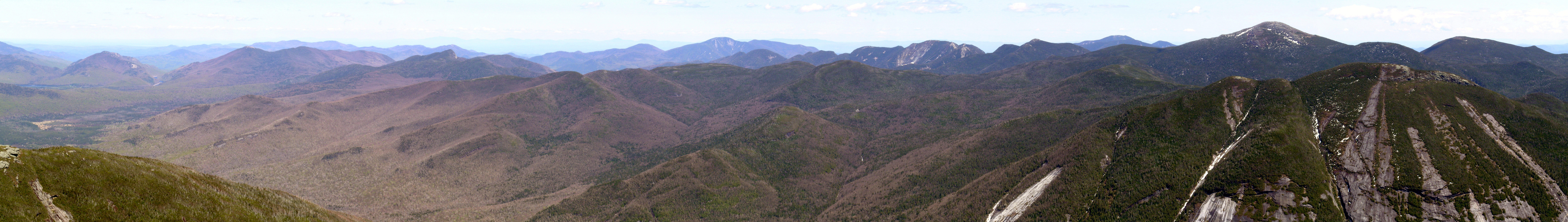
View from Algonquin Peak: (left to right) Pitchoff, Cascade, Porter, Big Slide, Yard, Phelps, Giant, Lower Wolfjaw, Upper Wolfjaw, Armstrong, Gothics, Saddleback, Basin, Nippletop and Dix, Hough, Marcy, Gray, Skylight, and Colden (foreground)
