= Marcy Dam =

Dam in New York, USA

Coordinates: 44°09′28″N 073°57′06″W

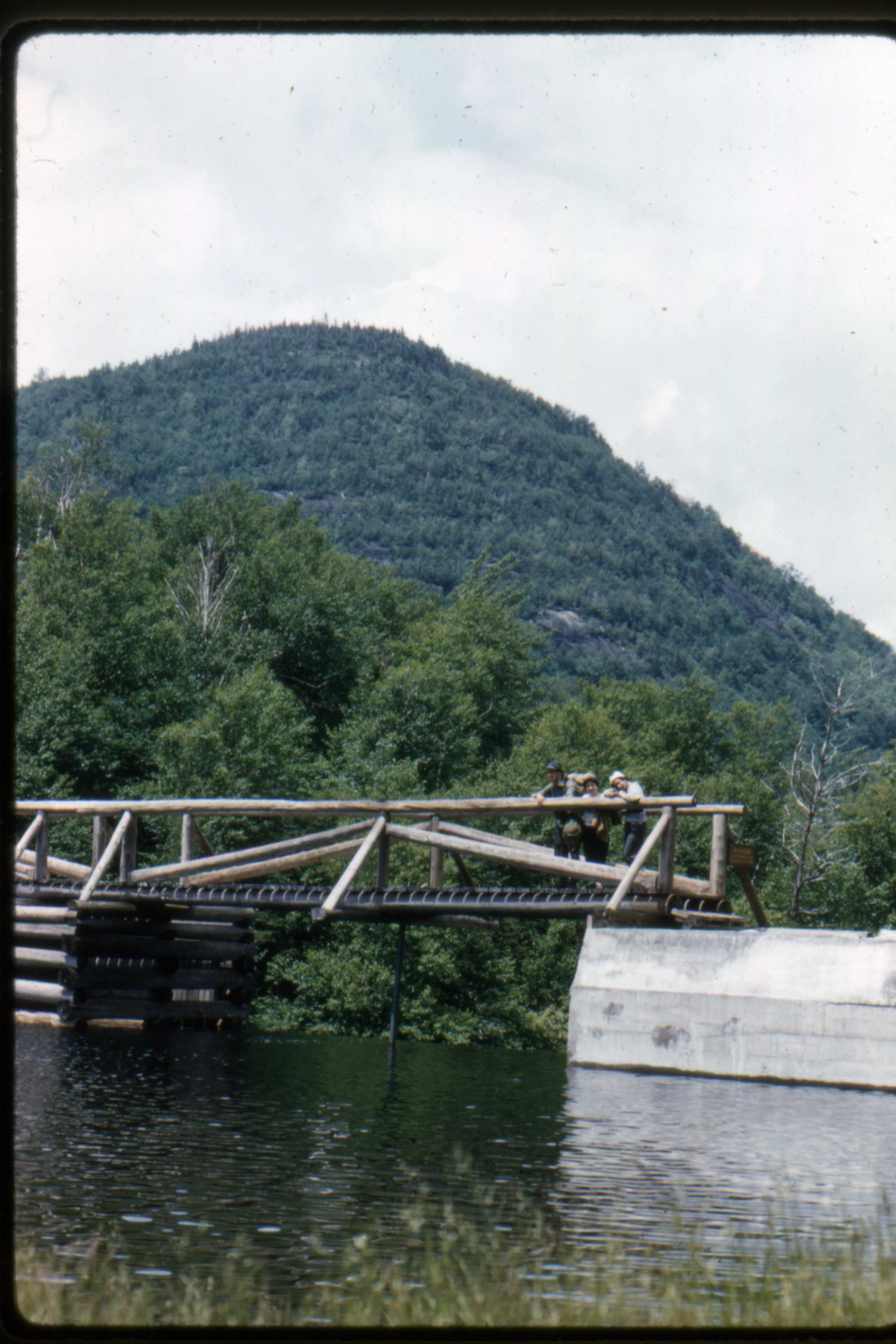
Marcy Dam – summer of 1960

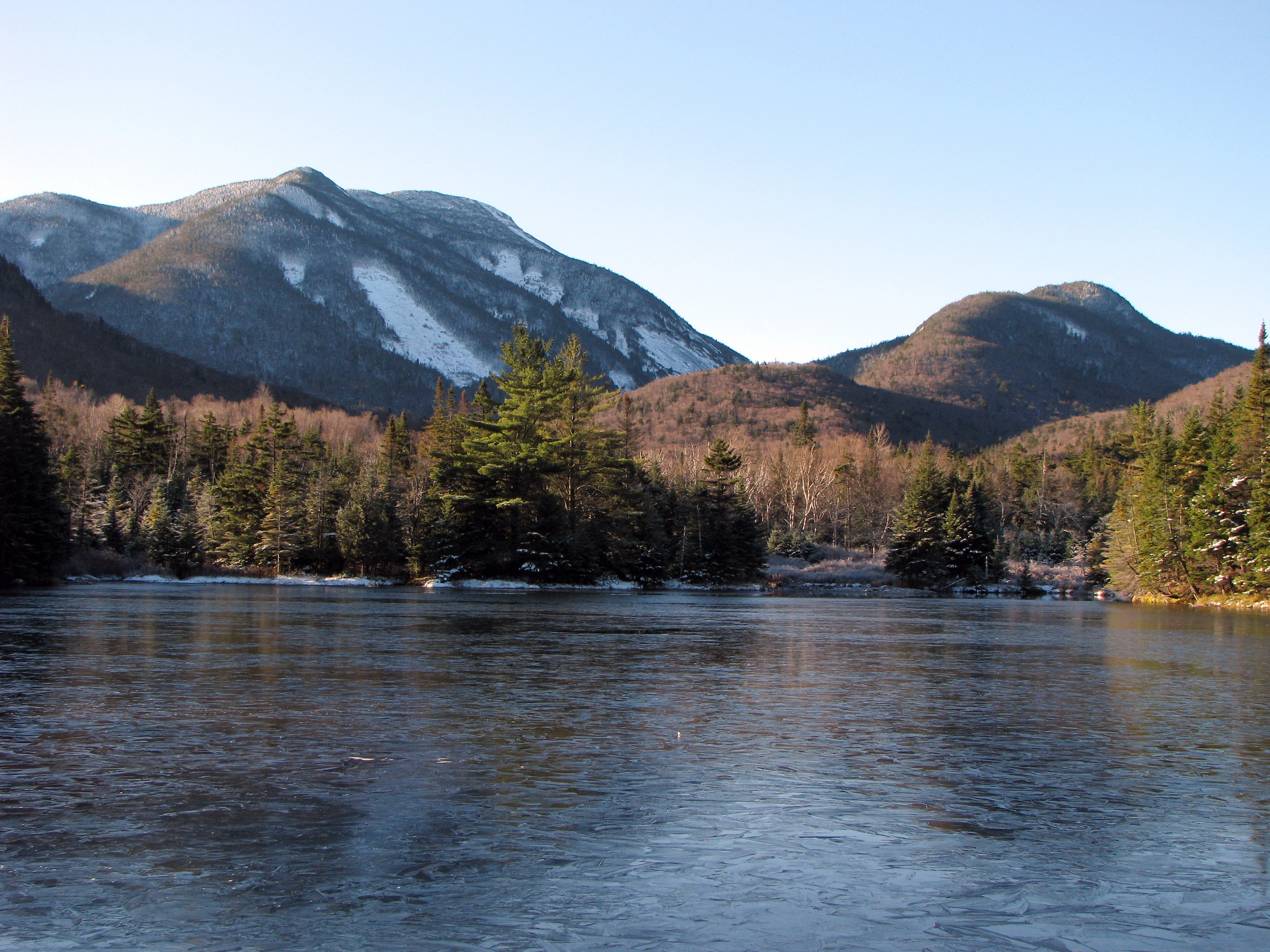
Marcy Dam Pond in 2008, from Marcy Dam, showing, left to right, TR Mountain, Mount Colden, Avalanche Mountain

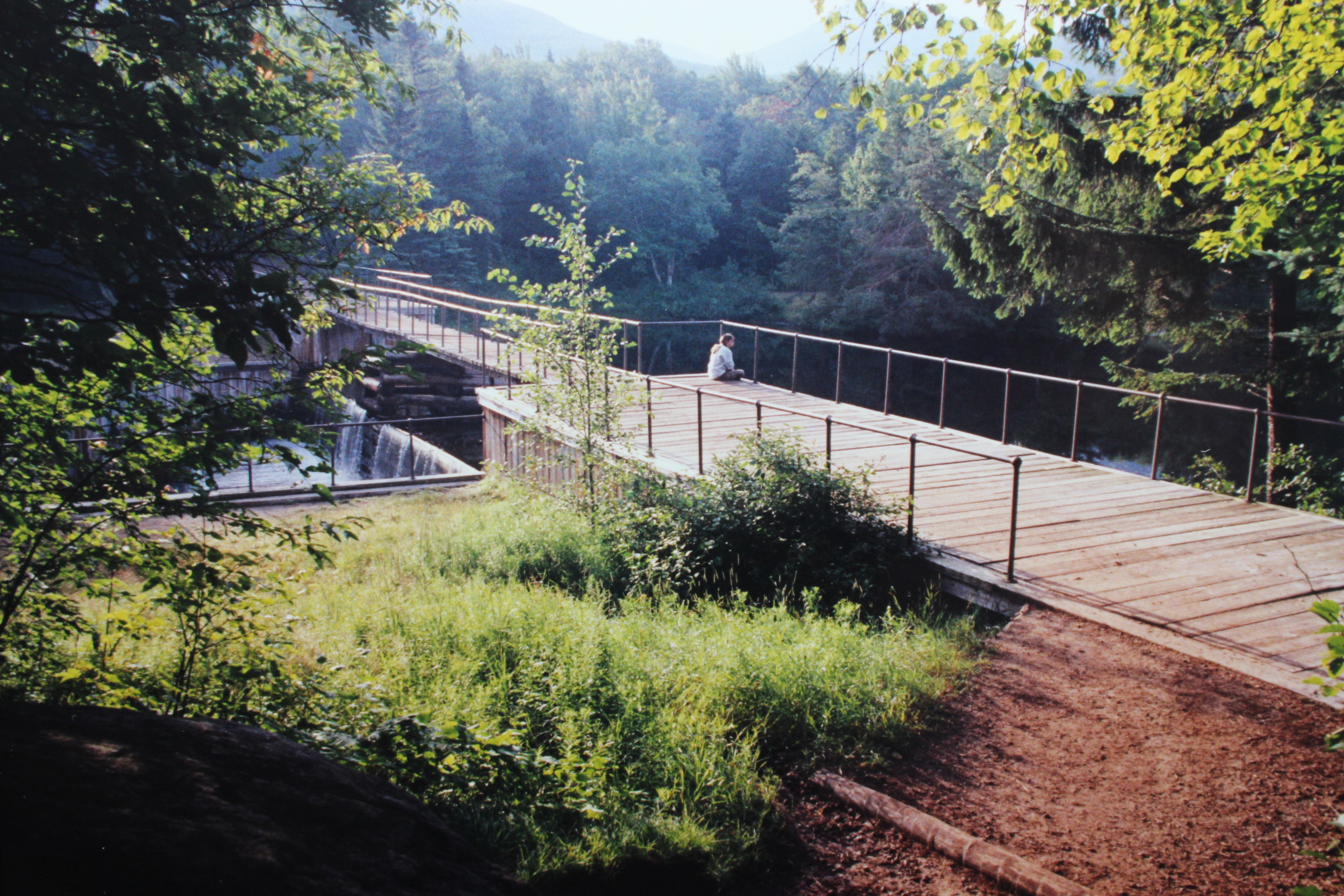
Marcy Dam - August 1990 - Viewed from the west

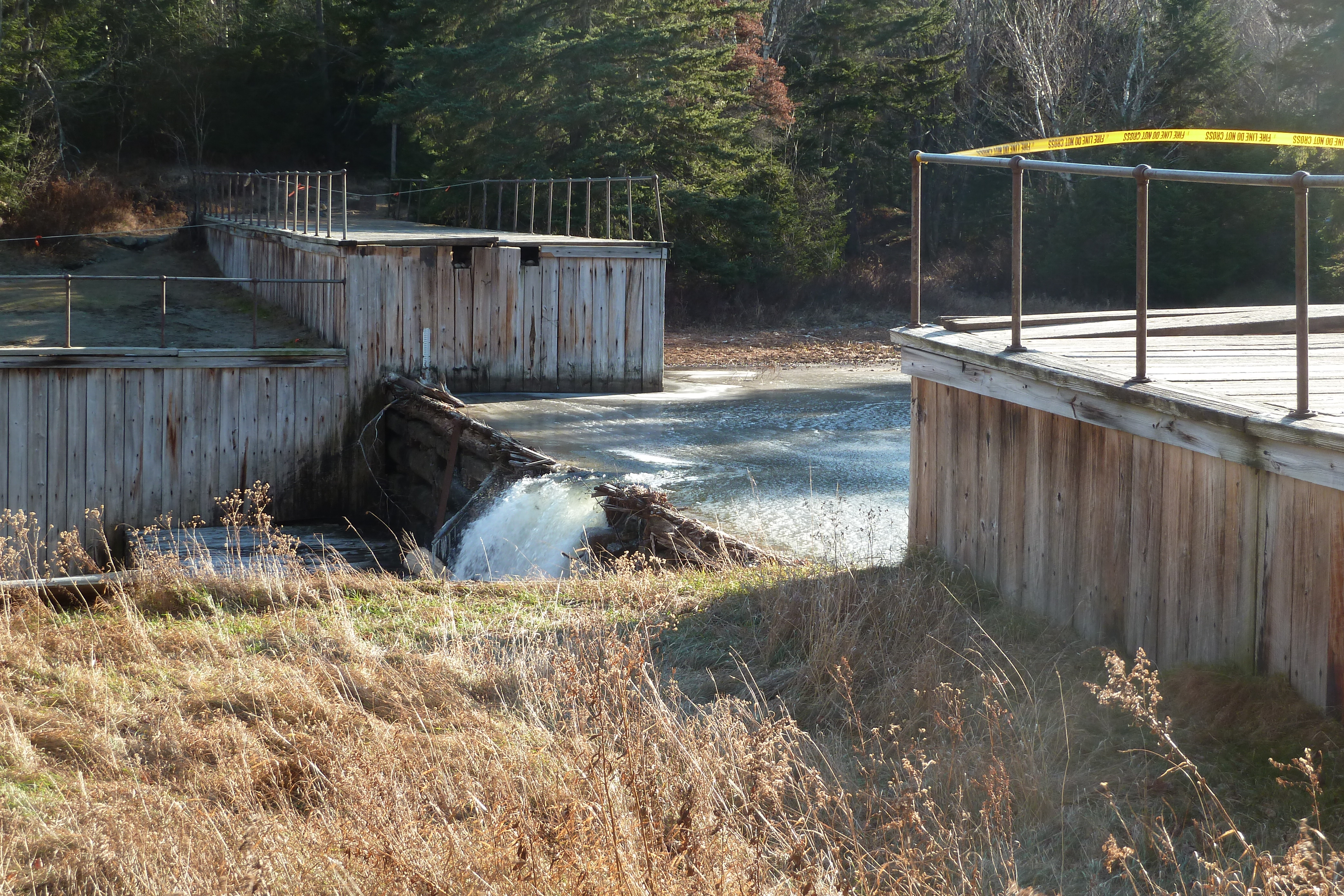
Marcy Dam in 2011 after being partially washed away by Hurricane Irene

Marcy Dam was a wooden dam on the Marcy Brook in the Adirondack High Peaks in North Elba, New York, United States; it impounded Marcy Dam Pond. An early version of the dam was constructed by the Conservation Corps during the 1930s. It was rebuilt most recently during the early 1970s.

Marcy Dam can be reached only by hiking; it lies 2.3 miles (3.7 km) from the Adirondack Loj at an elevation of 2,362 feet (720 m) surrounded by Whales Tail Mountain, Wright Peak, Algonquin Peak, Avalanche Mountain, Mount Colden, TR Mountain, and Phelps Mountain.

The area around where the dam stood is a popular camping spot for hikers in the high peaks. The New York State Department of Environmental Conservation maintains an Interior Outpost on the western shore. There are a number of campsites and lean-tos in the area, and trails lead from the dam to most of the high peaks; Mount Marcy is 3.5 miles (5.6 km) to the southeast.

During Hurricane Irene, the dam was damaged due to flooding and the pond was partially drained. The trail that went over the dam has been rerouted downstream.

In January 2014, the New York State Department of Environmental Conservation announced that Marcy Dam would be removed. NYSDEC explained that the "dam no longer holds back water during low flow periods and has an inadequate spillway." The department added that contemporary standards for this structure would make reconstruction expensive. Finally, NYSDEC noted that "the principles of wilderness management include allowing rivers and streams to flow unfettered and to minimize human-made structures."
