= Mount Clinton =

Mount Clinton may refer to:

- Mount Clinton, Virginia, unincorporated community in Rockingham County, Virginia
- Mount Marshall (New York), mountain in Essex County, New York, formerly known as Mount Clinton
- Mount Pierce (New Hampshire), mountain in Coös County, New Hampshire, formerly known as Mount Clinton
