= Adirondack Mountain Club =

Nonprofit organization in New York, U.S.

Coordinates: 44°10′58″N 73°57′59″W

- Logo of the Adirondack Mountain Club
- Founded: 1922
- Members: 30,000
- Website: www.adk.org

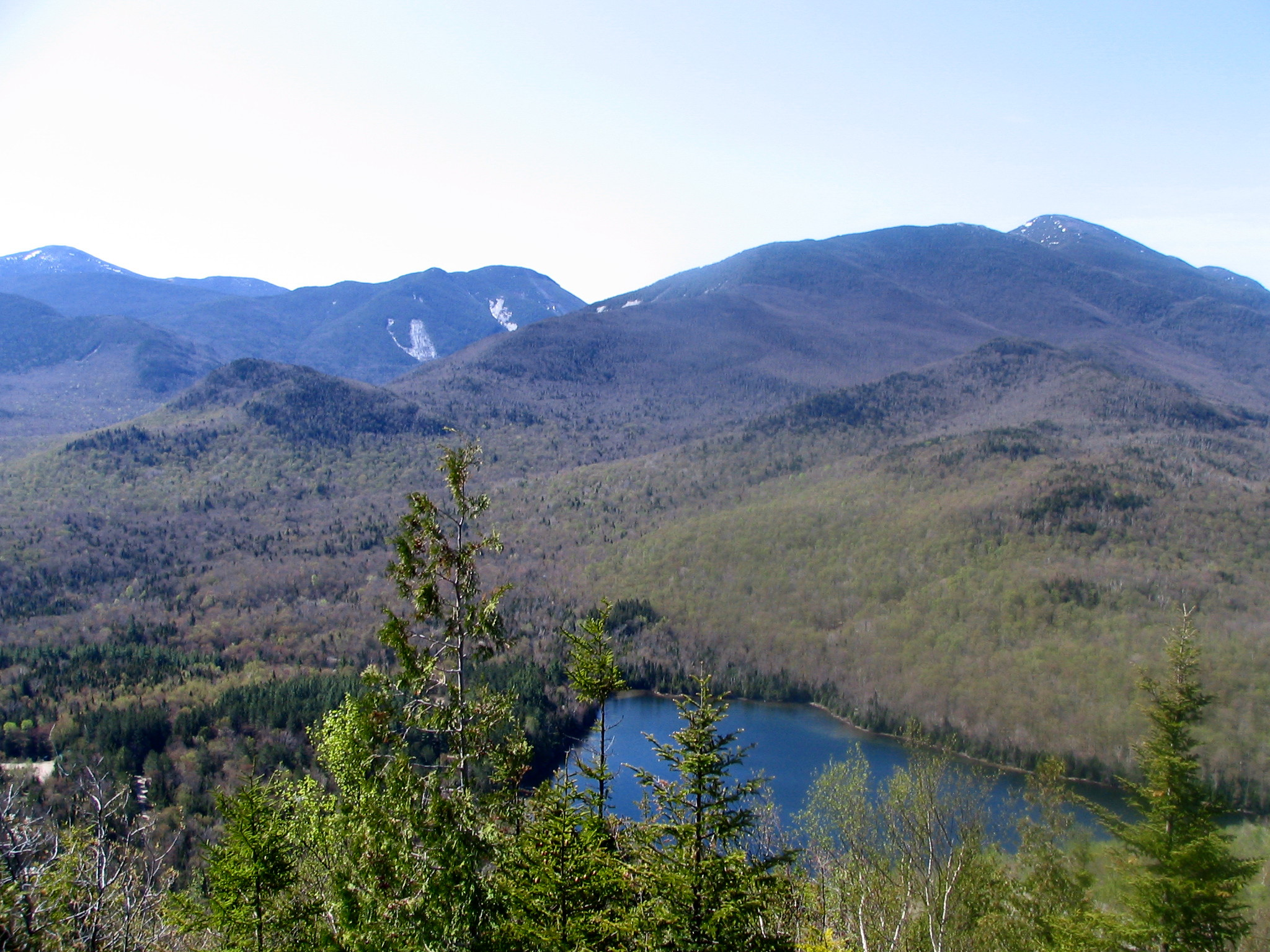
Heart Lake from Mount Jo, Algonquin Peak at right. The Loj clearing is at lower left.

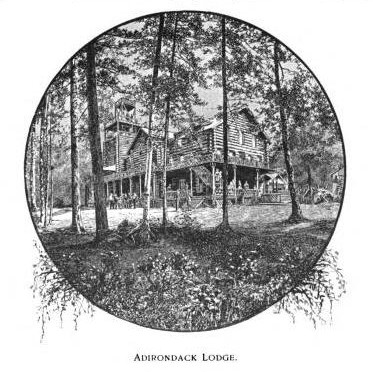
Henry Van Hoevenberg's original Adirondack Loj, that burned in 1903

The Adirondack Mountain Club (ADK) is a nonprofit organization founded in 1922. It has approximately 30,000 members. The ADK is dedicated to the protection and responsible recreational use of the New York State Forest Preserve, parks, wild lands, and waters; it conducts conservation, and natural history programs. There are 27 local chapters in New York and New Jersey. The club has worked to increase state holdings in the Adirondack Park and to protect the area from commercial development.

== History ==
The idea of forming the ADK was conceived by Meade C. Dobson, an official of the New York State Association of Real Estate Boards and the secretary of the Palisades Interstate Park Trail Conference, who felt there was need for a private organization that could help the State develop trails and shelters to make remote areas of the Adirondacks more accessible to hikers and backpackers. Encouraged by support from George D. Pratt, Conservation Commissioner of New York State, and William G. Howard, Superintendent of Forests, Dobson invited other like-minded individuals to an organizational meeting.

The initial meeting, attended by 40 people, took place on December 5, 1921, in the log cabin atop the Abercrombie & Fitch sporting goods store in New York City. An organization committee was formed, including representatives of outing, recreational, educational, government, and business interests. The club's objectives were to develop and maintain hiking trails, to construct and maintain campsites and permanent camps, to publish trail maps and guidebooks, and to educate the public regarding the conservation of natural resources and prevention of forest fires.

In its early years when there were few trails, ADK supplemented the work of the New York State Conservation Department by clearing and marking 140 miles of trails. One of the first trails constructed by club members was the 133-mile Northville-Placid Trail which traverses the Adirondacks in a north-south orientation.

Gifford Pinchot, first chief of the U.S. Forest Service, was an early member, and Franklin and Eleanor Roosevelt were life members of the ADK.

In an introduction to the club's 20th anniversary Annual Report in 1942, then president Roosevelt wrote "[This is] an appropriate time to emphasize the Club's initial statement of policy, adhered to and acted upon vigorously throughout the years, that 'the Adirondack Forest preserve belongs to the people of the State of New York' and that 'we believe in a continuing policy that shall give the widest and wisest use of the Forest to all.' "

The Adirondack Mountain Club has worked to make sites more accessible. In August 2023, they opened two accessible sites at the Wilderness Campground at Heart Lake.

Beginning in 2020, the group planned to work on the Long Trail up Mt. Jo, and in October 2023, they finished their work on the new trail. On October 14, the ADK had a ribbon cutting ceremony and 50 members hiked up the trail to celebrate. The trail is near Lake Placid, and more than 18,000 visitors come to the trail annually, which led to the trail needing restoration. The trail restoration was funded by the Regional Office of Sustainable Tourism Local Enhancement and Advancement Fund.

== Activities ==
The club maintains two lodges, the Adirondak Loj in North Elba and the Johns Brook Lodge in Keene Valley, which provide bunkrooms and private rooms, and communal meals as well as campsites. Johns Brook, at the foot of the Great Range, is accessible only by hiking, with the easiest route being a 3.5-mile (5.6 km) hike from Keene Valley. ADK offers extensive programming all across New York State all year around. Activities include hiking, biking, paddling, snowshoeing, skiing and much more.

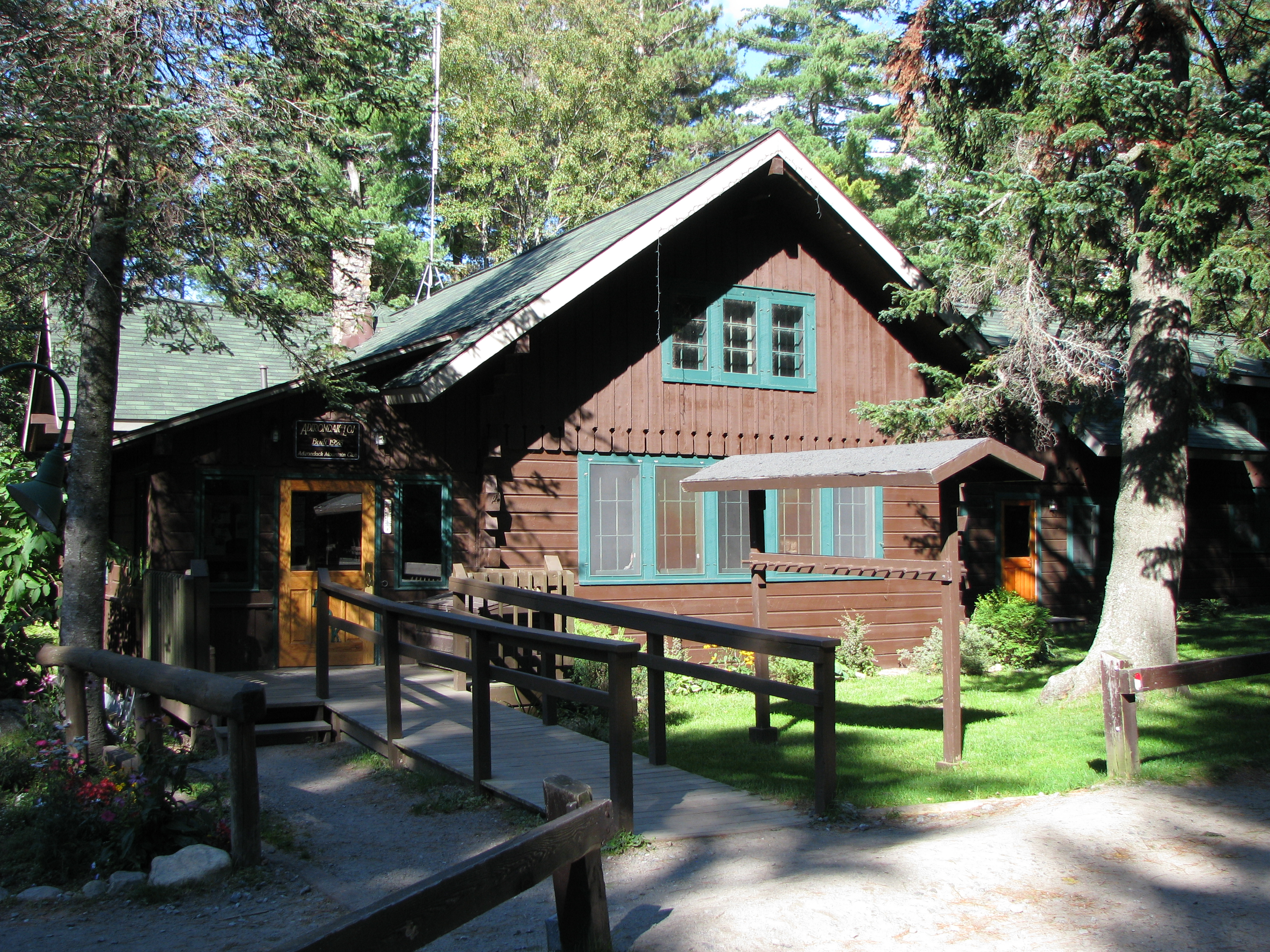
The Loj

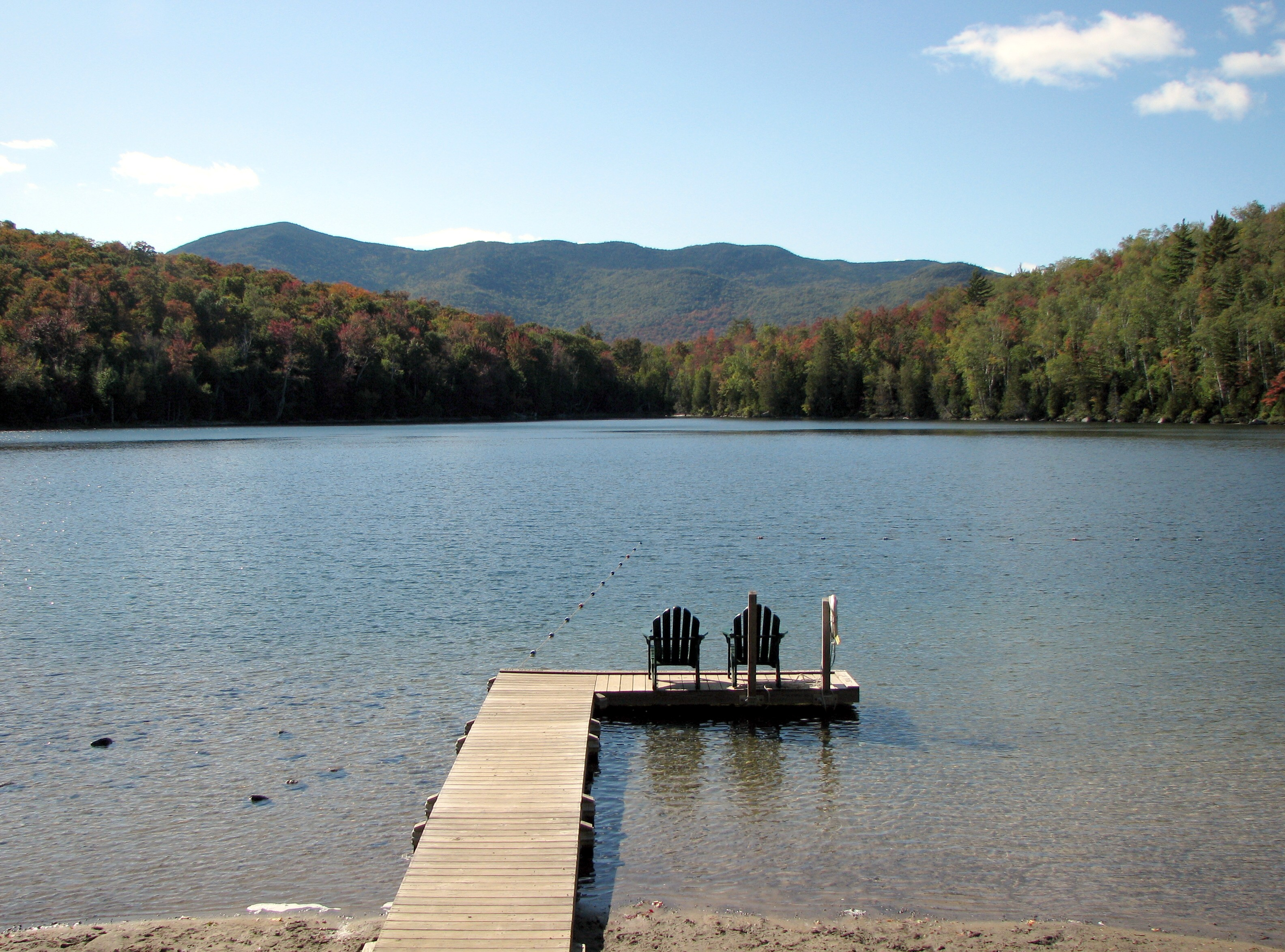
Heart Lake, from the Loj
