= Mount Jo =

Mountain in New York, United States

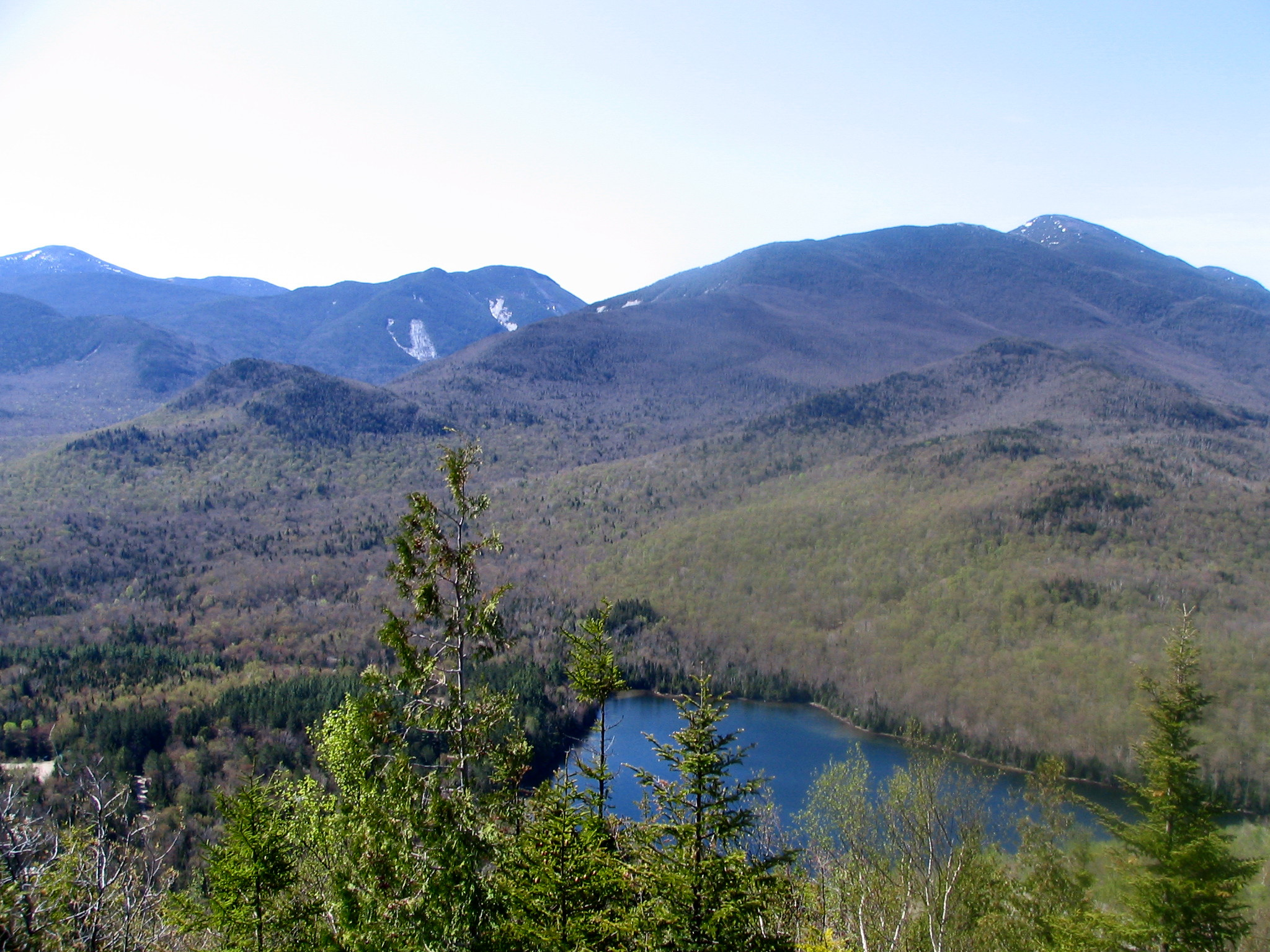
- Heart Lake from Mount Jo, Mount Colden, center, Algonquin Peak at right

Highest point
- Elevation: 2,832 ft (863 m)
- Coordinates: 44°11′22″N 73°58′01″W

Geography
- Location within New York Adirondack Park Location within the United States
- Location: Essex County, New York
- Topo map: USGS North Elba

Mount Jo is a 2,832-foot-tall (863 m) mountain in the heart of the Adirondack Mountains of New York. It is in North Elba, New York on land owned by the Adirondack Mountain Club. The Adirondack Loj and Heart Lake are at the foot of Mount Jo. There are two trails that lead to its summit.

The Mountain offers great views of the High Peaks region, including Cascade Mountain, Mount Marcy, Algonquin Peak, Mount Colden and Indian Pass. It is near Heart Lake in North Elba. It is seven miles (11 km) south of Lake Placid.

The mountain was named in 1877 by Henry Van Hovenberg, who built the original Adirondack Loj, for his fiancée Josephine Schofield, who died shortly before they were to have been married.
