= Noah Porter =

American minister, academic, philosopher, author and anti-slavery activist (1811–1892)

The Reverend Noah Porter
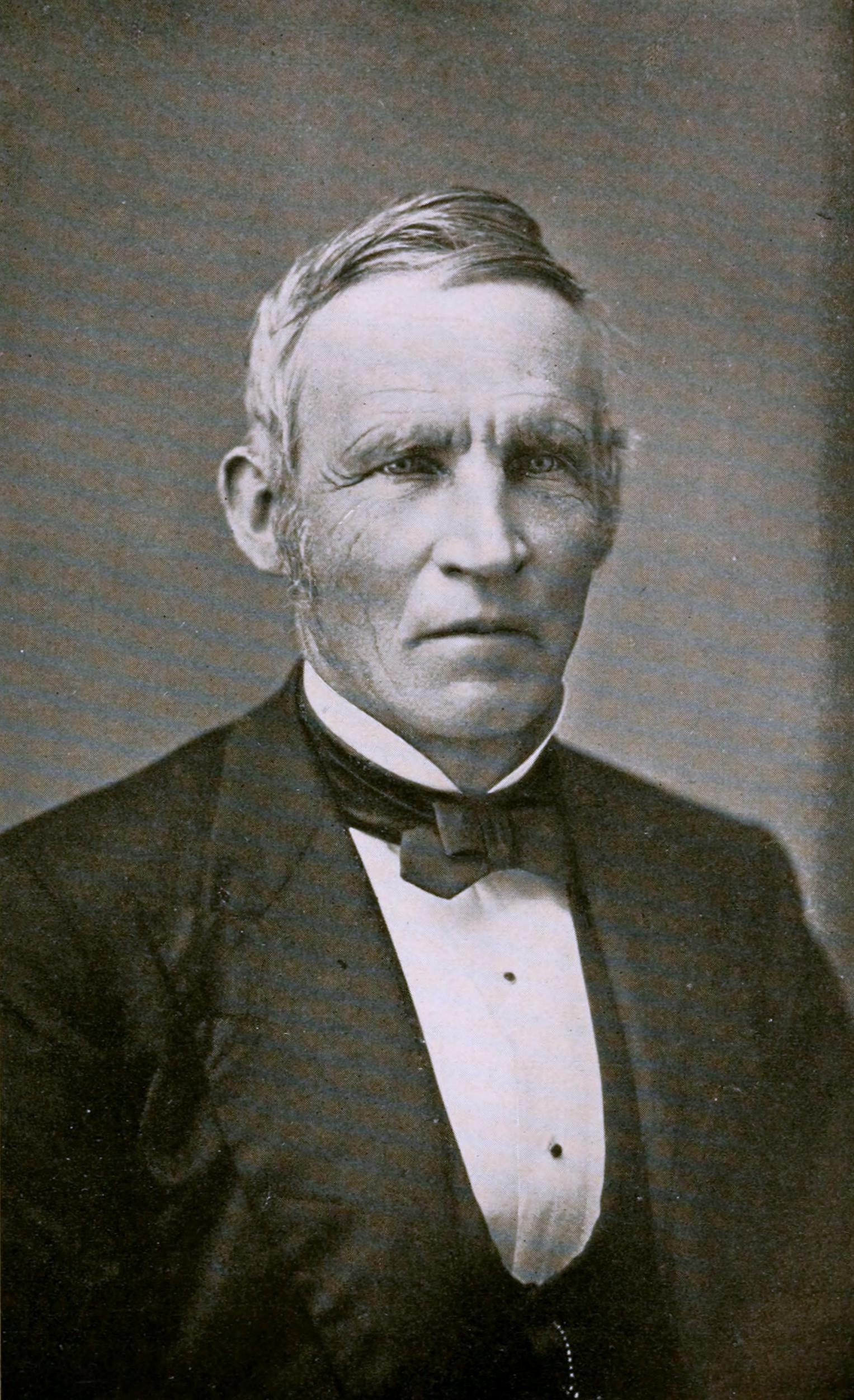

11th President of Yale University
- In office 1871–1886
- Preceded by: Theodore Dwight Woolsey
- Succeeded by: Timothy Dwight V

Personal details
- Born: Noah Thomas Porter III; December 14, 1811 Farmington, Connecticut
- Died: March 4, 1892 (aged 80) New Haven, Connecticut
- Education: Yale College

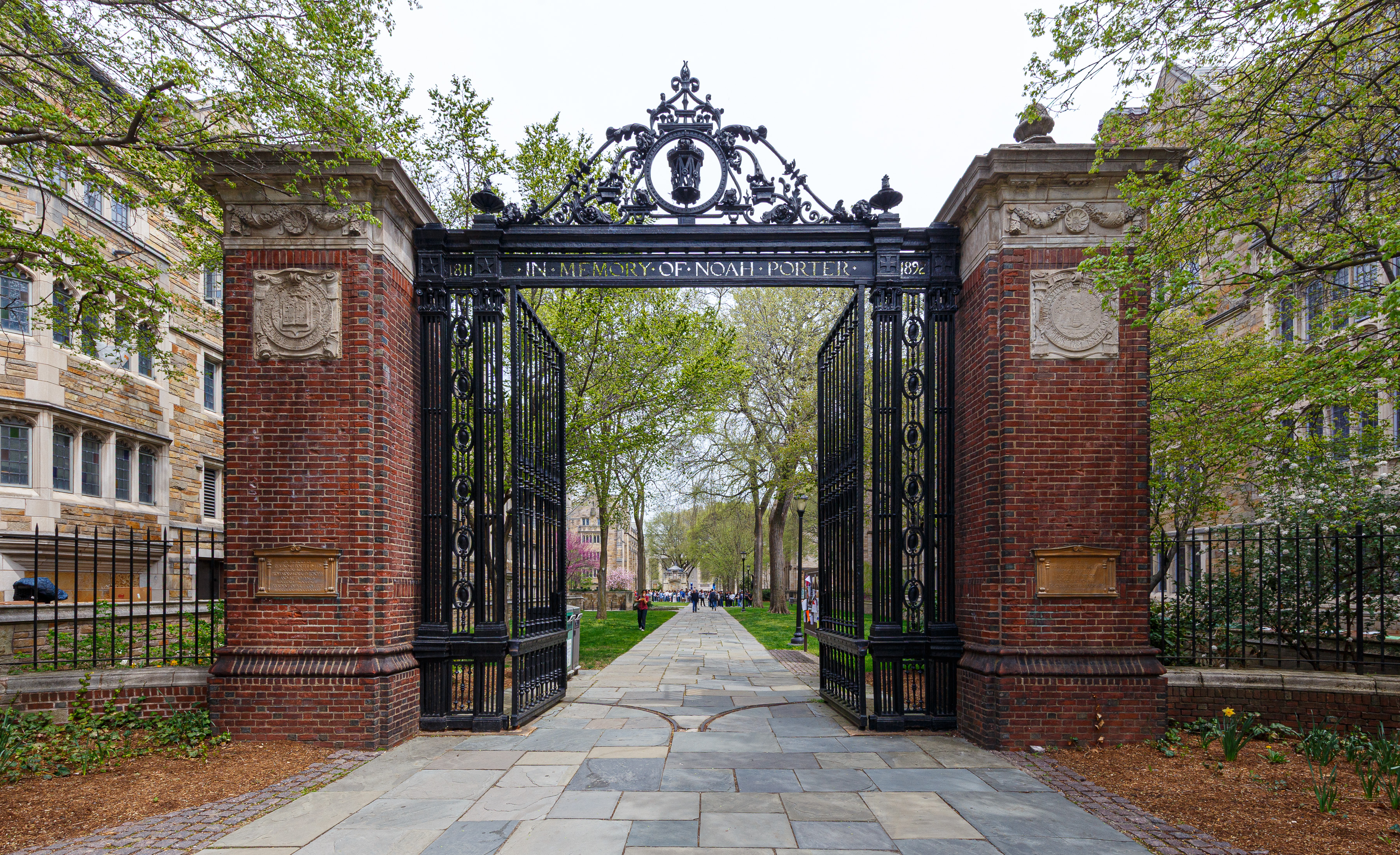
Noah Porter Gates at Yale University

Noah Thomas Porter III (December 14, 1811 – March 4, 1892) was an American Congregational minister, academic, philosopher, author, lexicographer and an outspoken anti-slavery activist. Porter Mountain, of the Adirondack Mountains, was named for him after he was the first to climb it in 1875. He was President of Yale College (1871–1886).

== Biography ==
He was born to Noah Porter Jr. (1781–1866) (one of the first ministers of First Church of Christ, Congregational in Farmington, Connecticut) and his wife, born Mehitable Meigs, in Farmington, Connecticut, on December 14, 1811. His younger sister was Sarah Porter, founder of Miss Porter's School, a college preparatory school for girls. He graduated in 1831 from Yale College, where he was a member of the Linonian Society. On April 13, 1836, in New Haven, he married Mary Taylor, daughter of Nathaniel Taylor (who presided over the creation of the Yale Divinity School and created what came to be known as "New Haven theology") and his wife Rebecca Marie Hine. They had several children, and two daughters survived them.

He was ordained as a Congregational minister in New Milford, Connecticut, from 1836 to 1843. He served as pastor at a Congregational Church in Springfield, Massachusetts, from 1843 to 1846. He was elected professor of moral philosophy and metaphysics at Yale in 1846.

Porter was inaugurated as President of Yale College on Wednesday, October 11, 1871. He continued to serve as head of the college until 1886.

Porter edited several editions of Webster's Dictionary, and wrote on education.

Influenced by the German refugee writer and philosopher Francis Lieber, Porter opposed slavery and integrated an antislavery position with religious liberalism.

He was a frequent visitor to the Adirondack Mountains of New York, and in 1875 was among the first recorded to make an ascent of the peak later named Porter Mountain in his honor.

His best-known work is The Human Intellect, with an Introduction upon Psychology and the Human Soul (1868), comprehending a general history of philosophy, and following in part the "common-sense" philosophy of the Scottish school, while accepting the Kantian doctrine of intuition, and declaring the notion of design to be a priori. Of great importance were two other works, Elements of Intellectual Science (1871) and Elements of Moral Science (1885).

He died on March 4, 1892, in New Haven, and was buried in the Grove Street Cemetery there.

== Notes ==
Academic offices
Preceded by Theodore Dwight Woolsey	President of Yale College; 1871–1886	Succeeded by Timothy Dwight V
