= MacIntyre Mountains =

Mountain in the United States

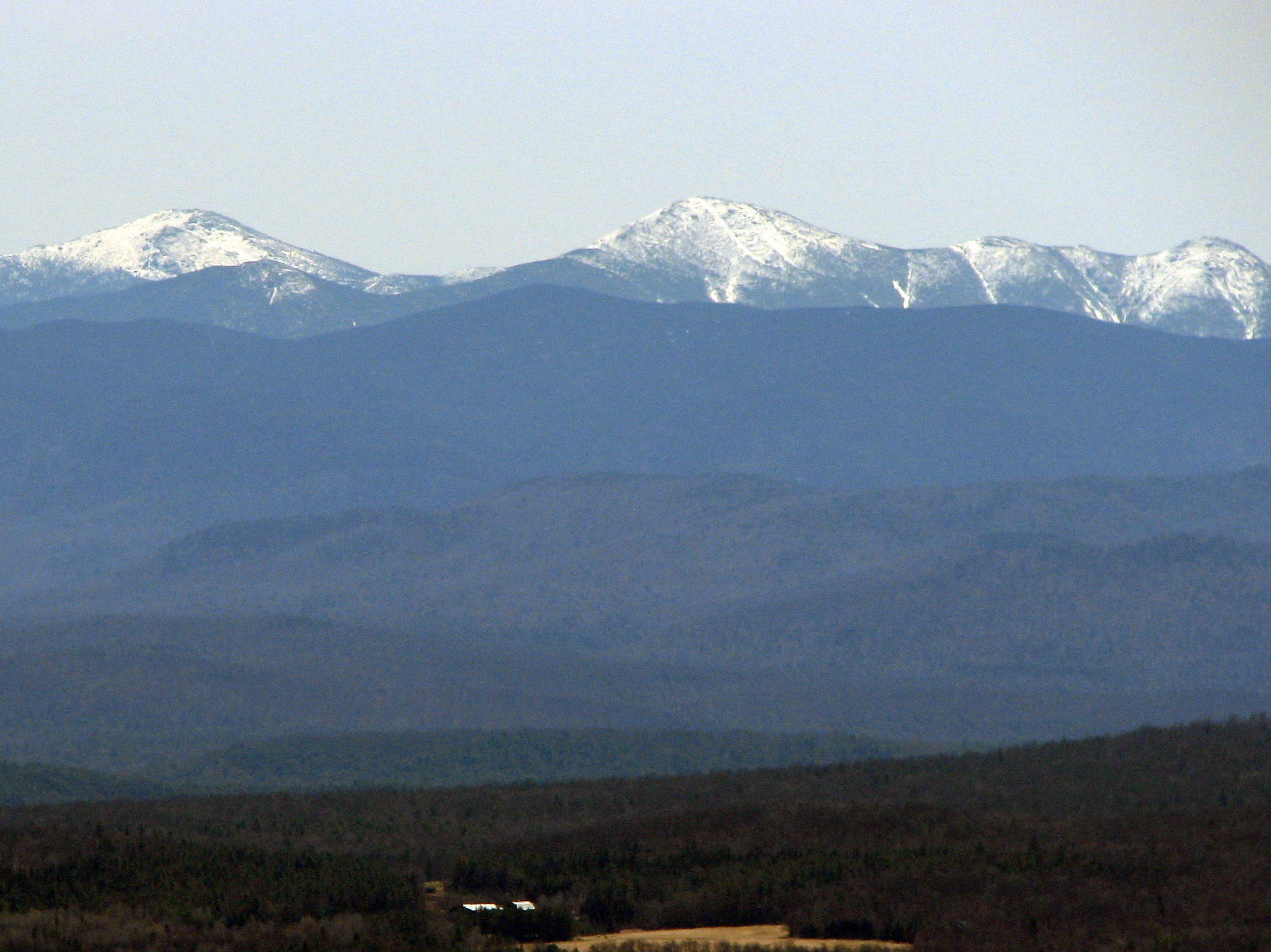
- The MacIntyre Range from St. Regis Mountain. At left is Mount Marcy, with Wright Peak just below it. In the center is Algonquin Peak; Iroquois Peak is at far right.

Highest point
- Peak: Algonquin Peak
- Elevation: 5,115 ft (1,559 m)
- Coordinates: 44°8′37″N 073°59′12″W

Dimensions
- Length: 8 mi (13 km) NE–SW

Geography
- Location within New York
- Country: United States
- State: New York
- Region: Adirondack Park
- Range coordinates: 44°8′N 74°0′W
- Parent range: Adirondack Mountains

The MacIntyre Mountains or MacIntyre Range is a range of mountains in the High Peaks region of the Adirondacks, due west of Mount Marcy, in northeastern New York State. The range runs 8 miles (13 km) from southwest to northeast. Its sheer southwest slope makes up one side of Indian Pass, and a northeastern spur forms the cliffs of Avalanche Pass. From southwest to northeast, the range includes Mount Marshall, Iroquois Peak, Boundary Peak, Algonquin Peak, and Wright Peak. Algonquin is the second-highest peak in the Adirondacks.

Despite being spelled differently, the range is named for Archibald McIntyre, the founder of the McIntyre Iron Works at Tahawus, New York. The name McIntyre originally referred only to Algonquin Peak, and was given to the mountain in 1837 by a party led by New York state geologist Ebenezer Emmons. Mountaineer Russell Carson applied the name to the entire range in his accounts. The earliest recorded ascent on the range was made in 1797, when surveyor Charles Brodhead crossed Boundary Peak to mark the boundary of the Old Military Tract.

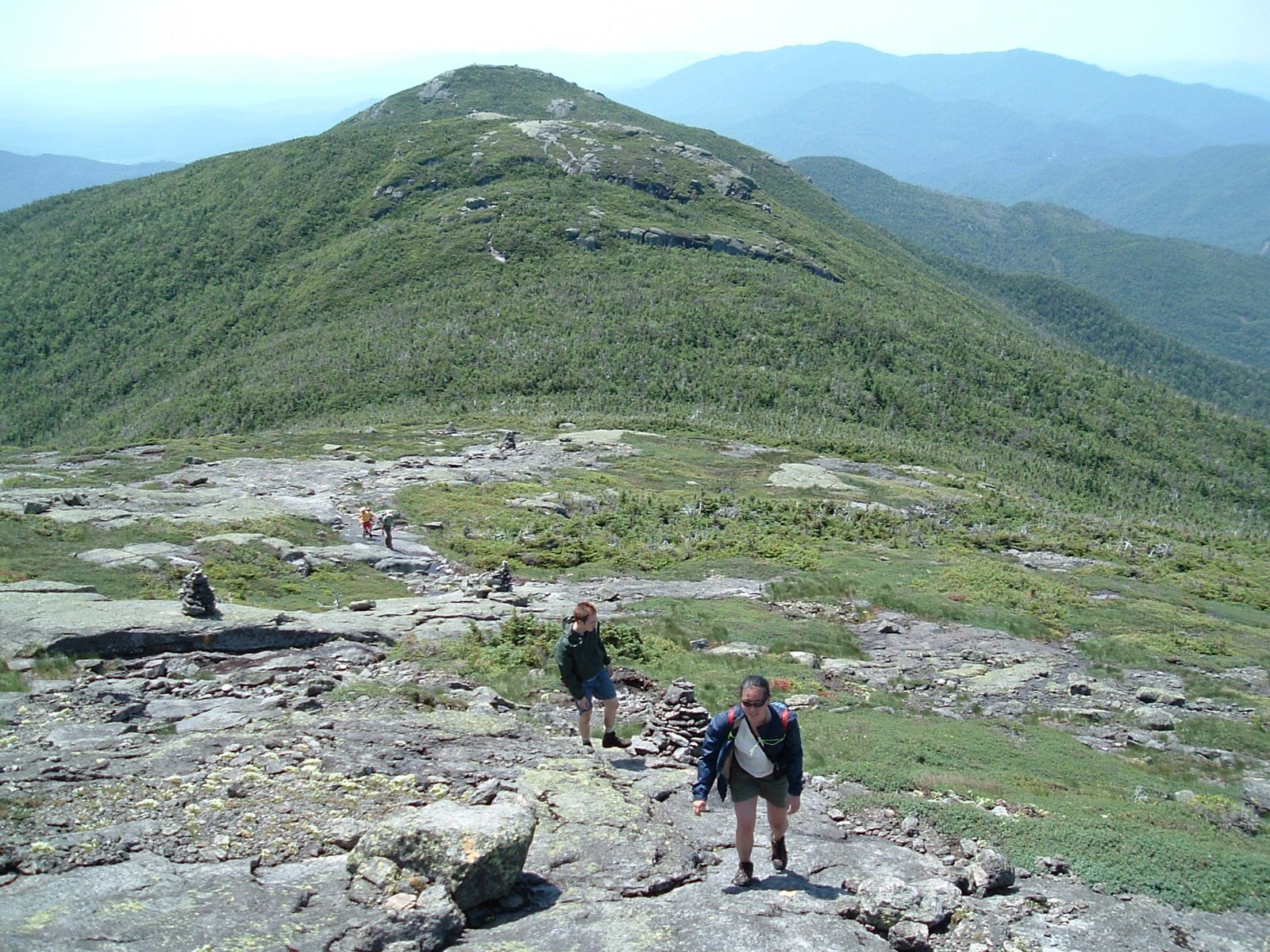
Iroquois Peak seen from Algonquin Peak

== See also ==
- List of mountains in New York
