= Mount Marshall (New York) =

Mountain in United States of America

- Location within New York Adirondack Park Location within the United States

Highest point
- Elevation: 4,360 ft (1,330 m) NGVD 29
- Listing: Adirondack High Peaks 25th
- Coordinates: 44°07′39″N 74°00′43″W

Geography
- Location: Newcomb, Essex County, New York
- Parent range: MacIntyre Mountains
- Topo map: USGS Ampersand Lake

Climbing
- First ascent: August 13, 1921, by Bob Marshall, George Marshall, and Herbert K. Clark
- Easiest route: Hike

Mount Marshall is a mountain in the MacIntyre Range of the Adirondacks in the U.S. state of New York. With an elevation of 4,360 feet (1,330 m), it is the 25th highest mountain in the Adirondacks and one of the 46 High Peaks in Adirondack Park. It is located in the town of Newcomb in Essex County, flanked to the northeast by Cold Brook Pass and Iroquois Peak. Originally named for Governor DeWitt Clinton, and then for mountain guide Herbert Clark, it was renamed for wilderness activist Bob Marshall after his death. The summit can be accessed by hikers on an unmarked trail.

== Geography ==
Mount Marshall is located within the High Peaks Wilderness Area of New York's Adirondack Park. It has an elevation of 4,360 feet (1,330 m). Marshall is part of the MacIntyre Range, and is separated from Iroquois Peak to its northeast by a large valley known as Cold Brook Pass.

== History ==
The first recorded ascent of Mount Marshall was made August 13, 1921, by brothers Robert Marshall and George Marshall, along with mountain guide Herbert K. Clark. The trio completed the ascent as part of a challenge they had devised to climb all peaks over 4,000 feet (1,200 m) in the Adirondacks, which eventually evolved into the list of the 46 Adirondack High Peaks. Marshall's inclusion on the list soon became a source of confusion due to its name. Surveyor Verplanck Colvin had provided conflicting names for the peaks of the Macintyre Range, and used the names "Mount Clinton" (for Governor DeWitt Clinton) and "Mount Iroquois" interchangeably for the three mountains now known as Boundary Peak, Iroquois Peak, and Mount Marshall. The Marshall brothers believed the southernmost peak was the mountain Colvin intended to name "Iroquois", and Bob Marshall labeled it so in his pamphlet on the high peaks. After collaboration with the Marshall brothers, Russell M. L. Carson spread the list of high peaks in his 1927 book Peaks and People of the Adirondacks, where he proposed new names for several peaks, including assigning "Iroquois" to the current Iroquois Peak and renaming the southern peak of the Macintyre Range "Herbert Peak" after Herbert Clark. Carson also proposed renaming a mountain in the Dix Range, previously known as "Middle Dix", as "Mount Marshall" after the two brothers.

Carson's guide sold well and his proposed new names became popular with hikers, despite opposition from the Marshall brothers. Members of the Adirondack Mountain Club also objected to naming peaks after living persons, although the objections primarily came from antisemitic members who did not want the name of the Jewish Marshall family attached to a mountain. Club member Theodore Van Wyck Anthony succeeded in having Carson's proposed names removed from club maps in 1928. In 1937, the state Board on Geographic Names instead renamed Middle Dix to Hough Peak, after Franklin B. Hough, at the request of the New York State Conservation Department. Bob Marshall went on to become a prominent conservationist and died in 1939. In 1940, a group of Adirondack Forty-Sixers petitioned the state Board on Geographic Names to officially adopt the name Mount Marshall for the southern peak of the Macintyre Range, dropping the name Herbert Peak, as Herbert was still living at the time and would not be eligible for an officially named peak. The petition was successful, and the name Mount Marshall was officially adopted by the state in 1942.

This did not end the confusion over the mountain's name. The United States Board on Geographic Names (BGN) was unaware of the name change, and in the 1950s, the United States Geological Survey labeled Mount Marshall as Mount Clinton on its topographic maps. The names Clinton, Herbert, and Marshall would all remain in common use until December 1972, when the BGN approved the name Mount Marshall, finally standardizing the mountain's name.

== Ascent routes ==
There are no marked trails to the summit of Mount Marshall. Two unmarked trails have been designated by Forty-Sixers. The first begins on the Cold Brook Pass near the key col between Marshall and Iroquois, and continues another 0.7 miles (1.1 km) uphill. The second route involves hiking along Herbert Brook, starting at its intersection with the red-blazed trail 121 between the Calamity lean-tos and Lake Colden dam. The brook eventually merges with the first path and reaches the summit after 1.5 miles (2.4 km).

== See also ==
- List of mountains in New York
- Northeast 111 4,000-footers
