= Van Hoevenberg Trail =

Hiking trail in New York

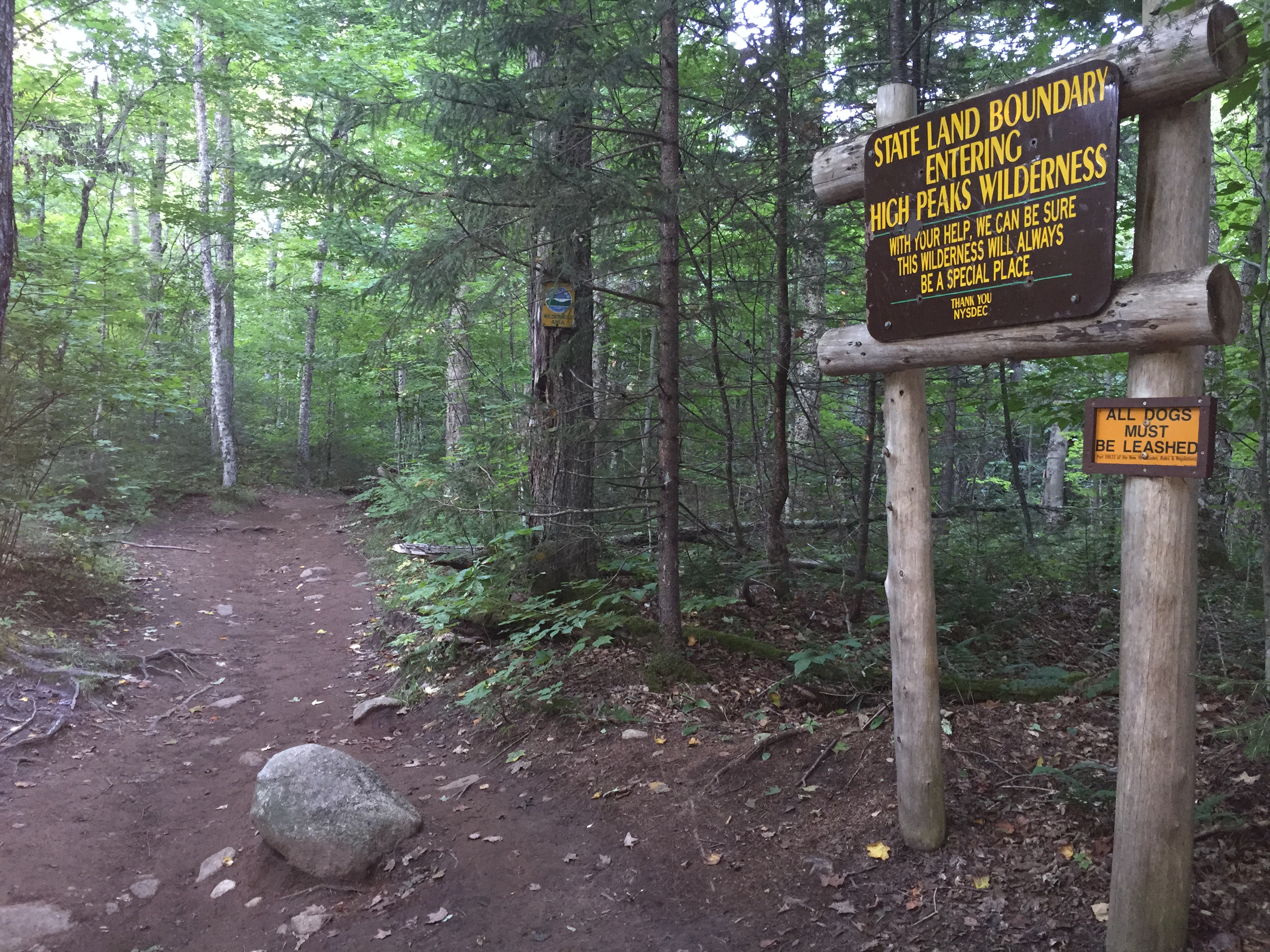
The view south about 0.7 miles south of the trailhead.

The Van Hoevenberg Trail is a hiking trail that leads southward from Adirondak Loj to the peak of Mount Marcy, the highest point in New York State. Located in the High Peaks Wilderness Area, it is the shortest and most frequently-used route to get to the peak of Mount Marcy. It spans 7.4 miles (11.2 km) to the summit, a lengthy 14.8-mile (22.4 km) roundtrip. A large section of the trail is suitable for alpine skiing and snowboarding. Hiking the trail is considered at least moderately difficult. The trail passes over Marcy Dam.

== Amenities ==
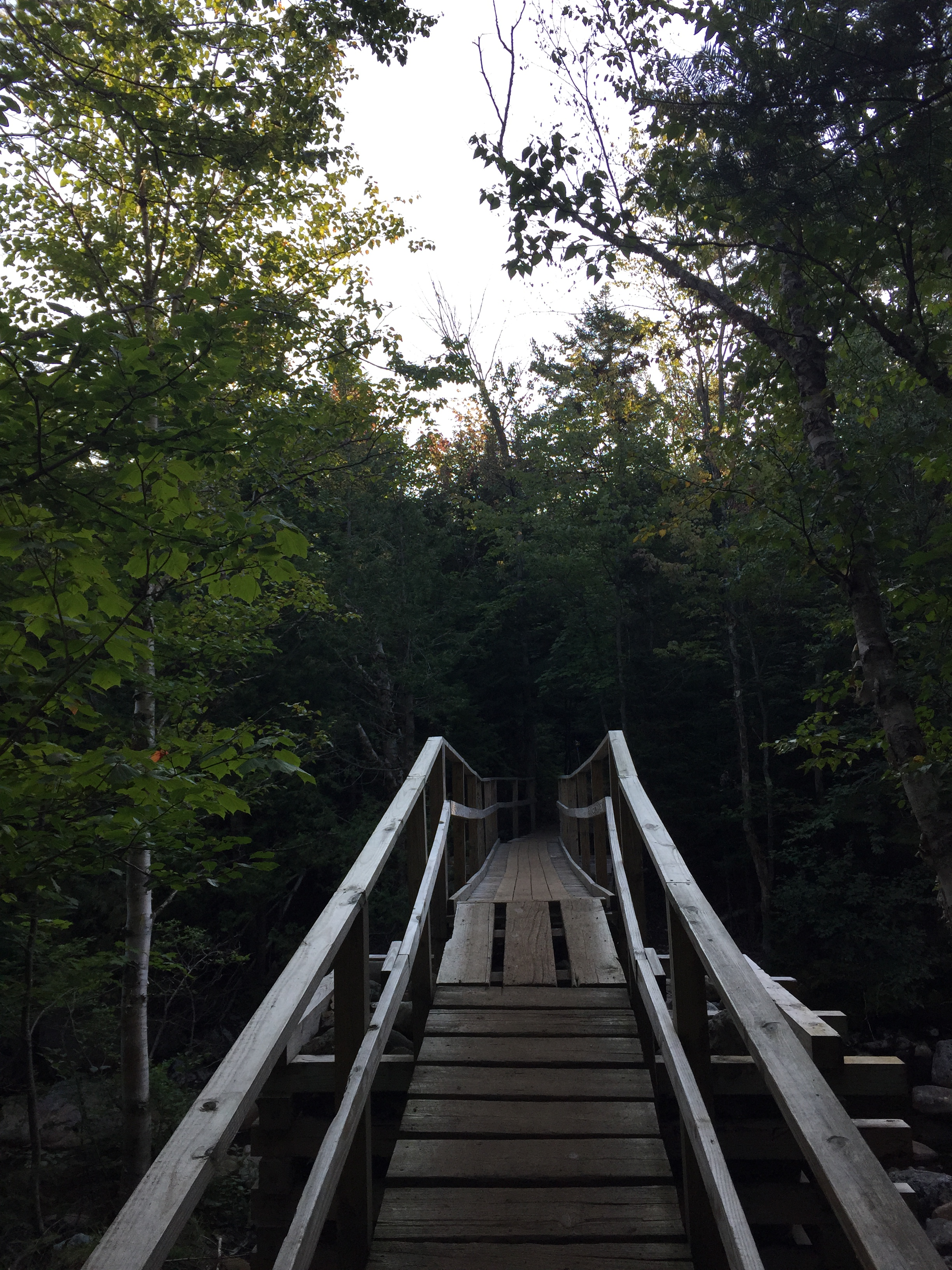
View south at the Marcy Brook Bridge about 2.2 miles south of the trailhead.

Adironack Loj at the start of the trail provides lodging and meals by reservation. There are also campgrounds and restrooms after about 2 miles into the trail, and further campgrounds and restrooms at about 3 miles into the trail. The New York Department of Environmental Conservation requires that anyone camping overnight in the region must keep their food stored in bear canisters.

== History ==
The trail is named after Henry Van Hoevenberg, who scouted the trail in addition to building the original Adirondack Loj. The route was initially cut by mountain guide William Nye. Lower portions of the trail required relocation and reconstruction following the Adirondack Fire in 1903.

== See also ==
- List of trails in New York
