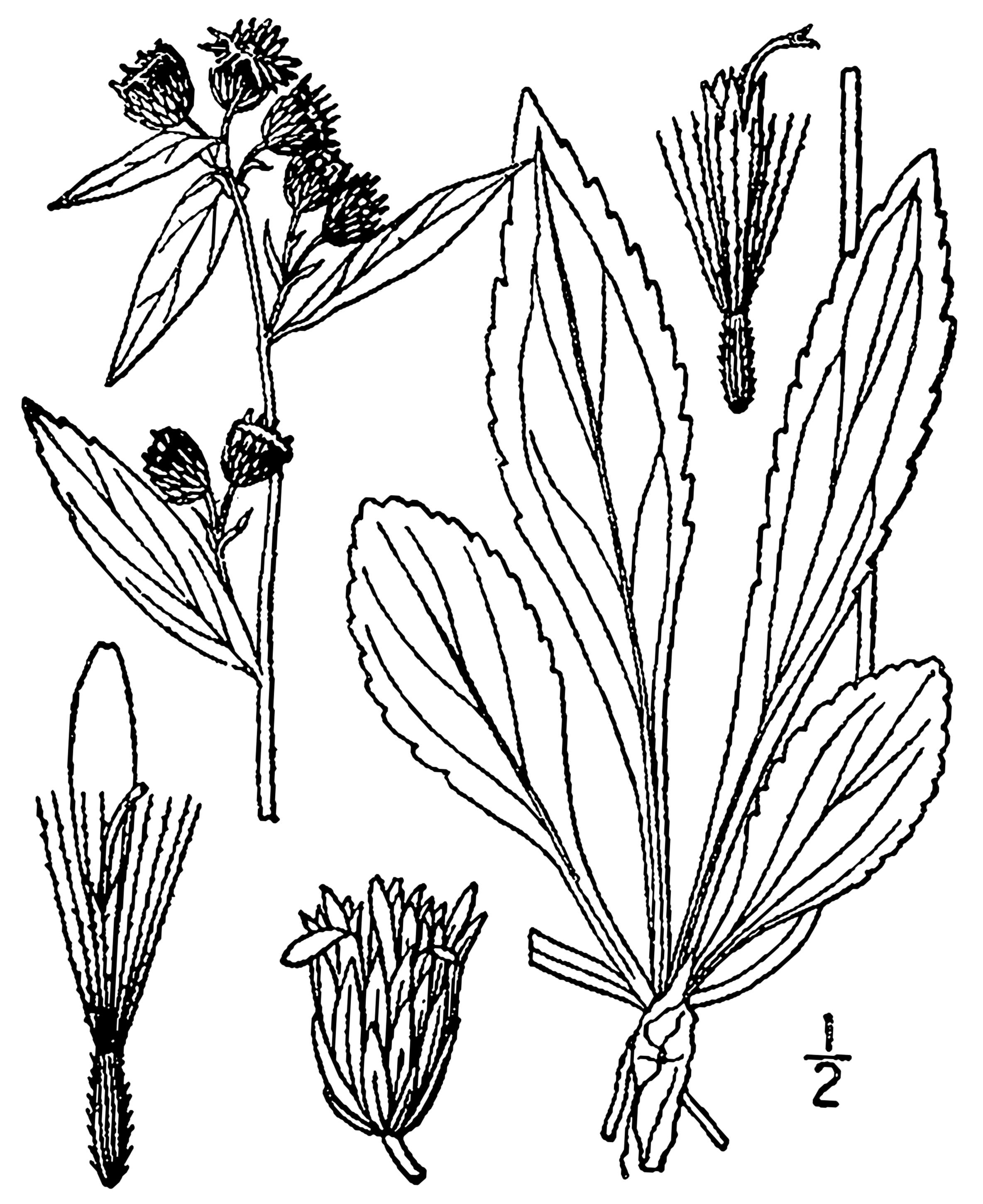
- 1913 illustration

Scientific classification
- Kingdom: Plantae
- Clade: Tracheophytes
- Clade: Angiosperms
- Clade: Eudicots
- Clade: Asterids
- Order: Asterales
- Family: Asteraceae
- Genus: Solidago
- Species: S. leiocarpa

Binomial name
- Solidago leiocarpa DC.

Synonyms
- Solidago cutleri Fernald; Solidago virgaurea var. alpina Bigelow

= Solidago leiocarpa =

Species of flowering plant

Solidago leiocarpa, common name Cutler's alpine goldenrod, is a plant species native to mountainous portions of Québec, northern New England, and northern New York State. It is generally found at elevations over 800 m (2400 feet).

Solidago leiocarpa is closely related to the more widespread S. multiradiata, distinguished by the shape of the phyllaries surrounding the flower heads. Solidago leiocarpais a perennial herb up to 35 cm (14 inches) tall. One plant can have as many as 160 small yellow flower heads in a flat-topped or conical array.
