= Trail map =

Map to aid navigation while using a trail

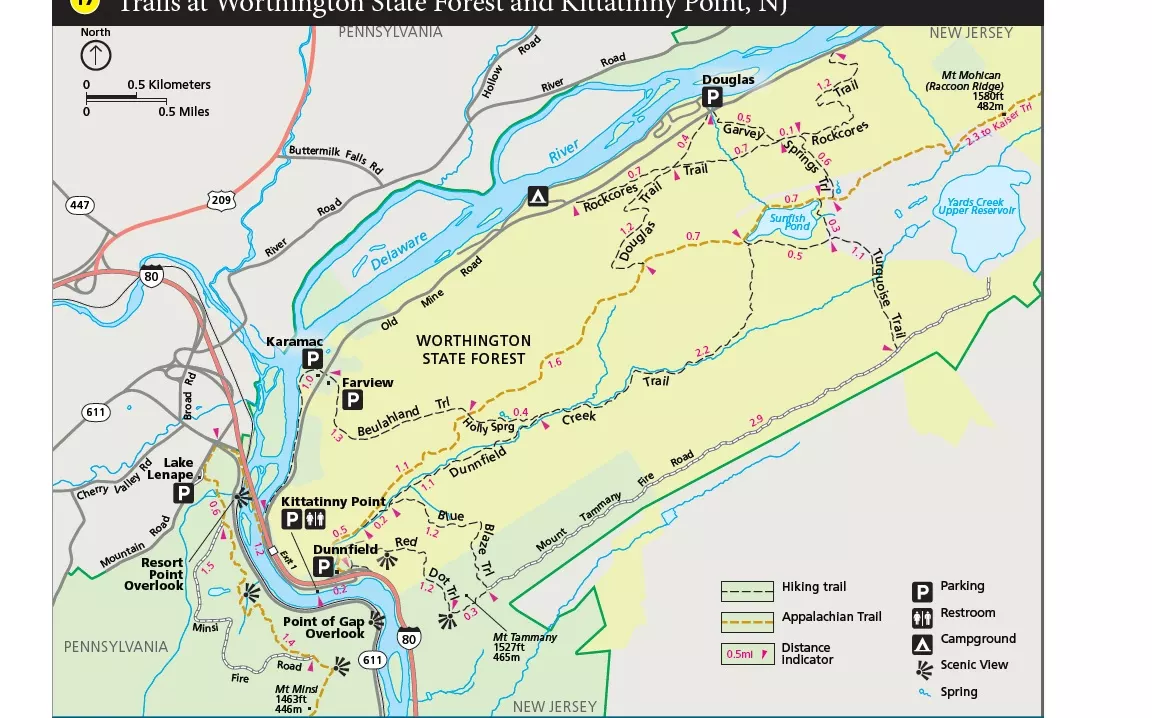
Map of trails at Mount Tammany near Kittatinny Point, New Jersey

A trail map is a map used to aid in navigation and can symbolize an assorted amount of information of a particular area or contain only a single representation of the data it represents.

== Overview ==
Trail maps are produced in a variety of scales, sizes, formats, and media, depending on the audience and purpose of the map. Some trail maps have been extensively edited for content giving detail about nearby features, places of interest, or interesting facts, while some maps may only give minimal information of the trail.

Hiking sometimes requires planning. Some web sites offer hikers necessary preparation “must-haves” when packing for a trip as well as information about various trails around the country. Included in the list of these essentials is the trail map.

Navigating through, to, and away from people's destinations require, in many instances, the use of maps, descriptions of or around those places, and/or a combination of these displayed on paper or through today's extended market of GPS devices. The maps help give the reader a graphic representation of the environment and may vary in the level of spatiality and labeling. Additionally, the written descriptions of a place also vary in the levels of spatial and labeling detail.

The personal experience coupled with the memory of an environment can change as a function of these mapping variations. Experiments have demonstrated that by reducing spatial details through ‘graphic generalization’ one can increase memory. Likewise, verbally presented information additionally reveals the importance of a balance between spatial and verbal detail in maps.

GPS and the integrated digital map technology is rapidly become the choice of many mountaineers in place the traditional paper map and compass. Additionally, some camera's have a GPS module included internally that allow the digital image to contain geographic coordinates that can help determine the location where the picture was taken. GPS has also helped with research and expeditions. GPS devices, along with satellite data has helped determine the heights of mountain peaks as well as the depths of subterranean pits and caves.

Interactive web services like Wikimapia and Google Maps support user-generated and modifiable maps. Users can import and ‘mashup’ shared source code into their own mapping service or they can geotag online content using markup languages to share information about their geographic location. New digital geospatial information is captured from normal activities of daily life, such as public transit agencies tracking locations of electronic payment with cards to board a bus, or GPS enabled cell phones that can track our movements and location.
