= Phelps Mountain (New York) =

Mountain in New York, United States

- Location within New York Adirondack Park Location within the United States

Highest point
- Elevation: 4,161 ft (1,268 m) NGVD 29
- Listing: Adirondack High Peaks 32nd
- Coordinates: 44°9.42′N 73°55.29′W

Geography
- Location: North Elba, Essex County, New York
- Parent range: Adirondack Mountains
- Topo map: USGS Keene Valley

Climbing
- First ascent: June 1904, by Charles Wood
- Easiest route: Hike

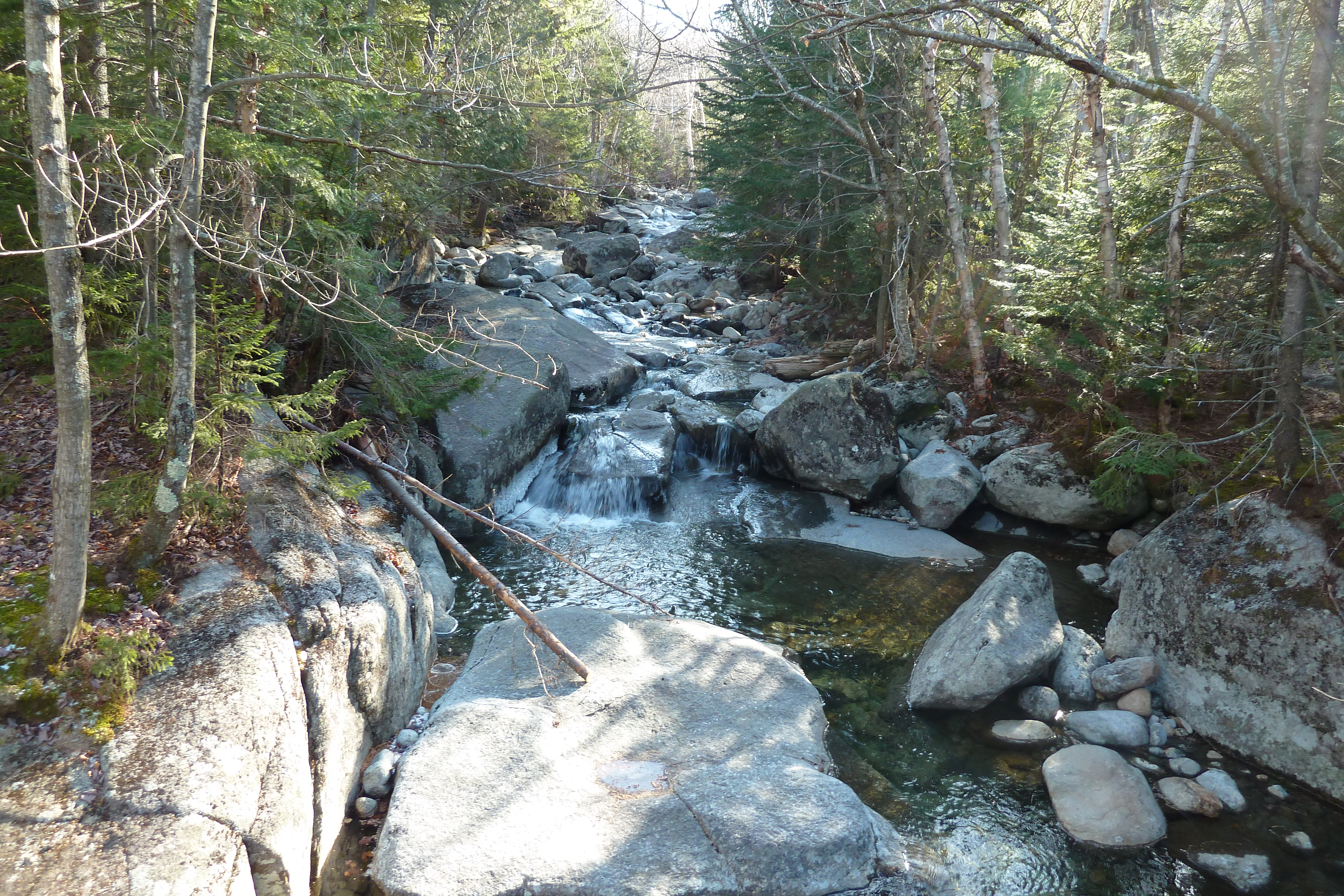
A stream on the way to Phelps Mountain from the Adirondak Loj

Phelps Mountain is a mountain in the Adirondacks in the U.S. state of New York. It is the 32nd-highest of the Adirondack High Peaks, with an elevation of 4,161 feet (1,268 m). The mountain is located in the town of North Elba in Essex County. It is named after Orson Schofield Phelps, also known as Old Mountain Phelps, a 19th-century trail guide in the Adirondacks who cut several trails to the peaks and gave some of the peaks their current names. Surveyor Verplanck Colvin was the first to name a mountain after Phelps in 1870, but the name was originally assigned to a spur of Mount Marcy, and was reassigned to the current Phelps Mountain by 1886. The first recorded ascent of Phelps Mountain was made in June 1904 by Charles Wood, an employee of the J. & J. Rogers Company, which owned the mountain and used it for logging.

The summit of Phelps can be accessed on a blazed trail. The shortest path to the summit begins on the Van Hoevenberg Trail at the Adirondak Loj, and continues past Marcy Dam. At 3.2 miles (5.1 km), the red-blazed trail to Phelps diverges to the left, and continues 1.2 miles (1.9 km) to the summit, for a total distance of 4.4 miles (7.1 km) and an ascent of 1,982 feet (604 m). The view from the summit is dominated by Mount Marcy. Phelps is the closest mountain to Marcy Dam and is considered a good alternative hike for hikers who cannot access Mount Marcy.

== See also ==
- List of mountains in New York
- Northeast 111 4,000-footers
- Adirondack High Peaks
- Adirondack Forty-Sixers
