= Iroquois Peak =

Mountain in the United States

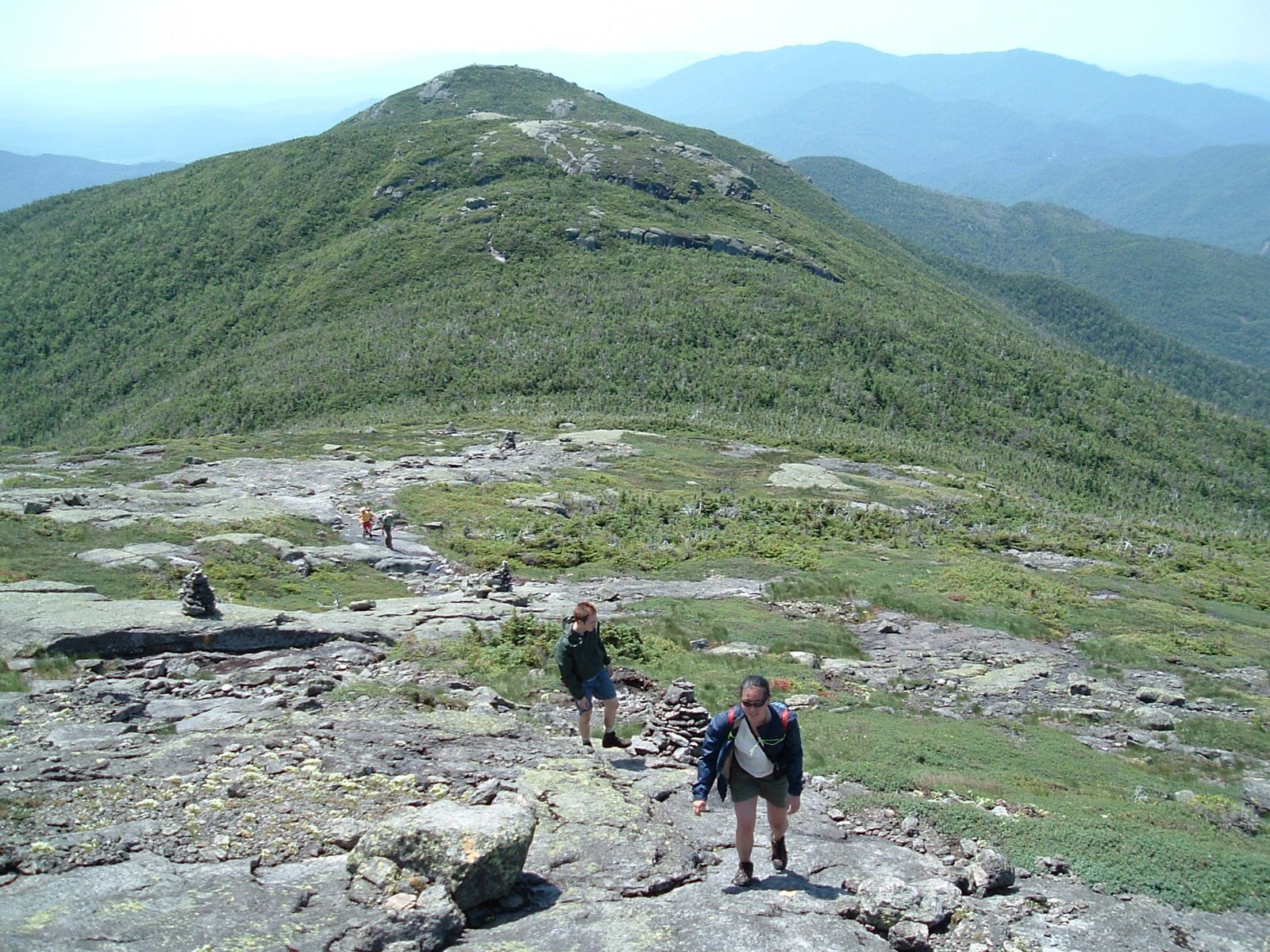
- Iroquois Peak seen from Algonquin Peak

Highest point
- Elevation: 4,840 ft (1,480 m) NGVD 29
- Listing: #8 Adirondack High Peaks
- Coordinates: 44°08′13″N 73°59′54″W

Geography
- Location within New York Adirondack Park Location within the United States
- Location: Newcomb, New York, U.S.
- Parent range: MacIntyre Range
- Topo map: USGS Keene Valley

Climbing
- First ascent: October 1883 by William H. Brown
- Easiest route: Hike

Iroquois Peak is a mountain in the MacIntyre Range of the Adirondacks in the U.S. state of New York. It is the eighth-highest peak in New York, with an elevation of 4,840 feet (1,480 m), and one of the 46 High Peaks in Adirondack Park. It is located in the town of Newcomb in Essex County. Although the mountain does not have an officially maintained trail, a well-maintained herd path marked by cairns exists between the summits of Iroquois Peak and Algonquin Peak, 1.1 miles (1.8 km) to the northeast.

The earliest recorded ascent of the mountain was made in October 1883 by William H. Brown, who erected a signal for the Colvin survey team on the summit. Verplanck Colvin likely made an unrecorded ascent prior to Brown. Colvin marked the peak with three different names on survey maps: South MacIntyre, after Archibald McIntyre and the nearby Mount MacIntyre (now Algonquin peak); Mount Clinton, for Governor DeWitt Clinton; and Mount Iroquois, based on the fact the mountain fell near the latitude of a supposed Algonquin and Iroquois boundary that divided hunting grounds in the Adirondacks. In reality, no such boundary extended into the mountains. The name of the mountain was still uncertain in the 1920s, when the Marshall brothers were compiling the list of Adirondack High Peaks and assigned the name "Iroquois" to nearby Mount Marshall instead. After discussions between the brothers and Russell Carson, the name "Iroquois" was then assigned to its present location.

== Gallery ==
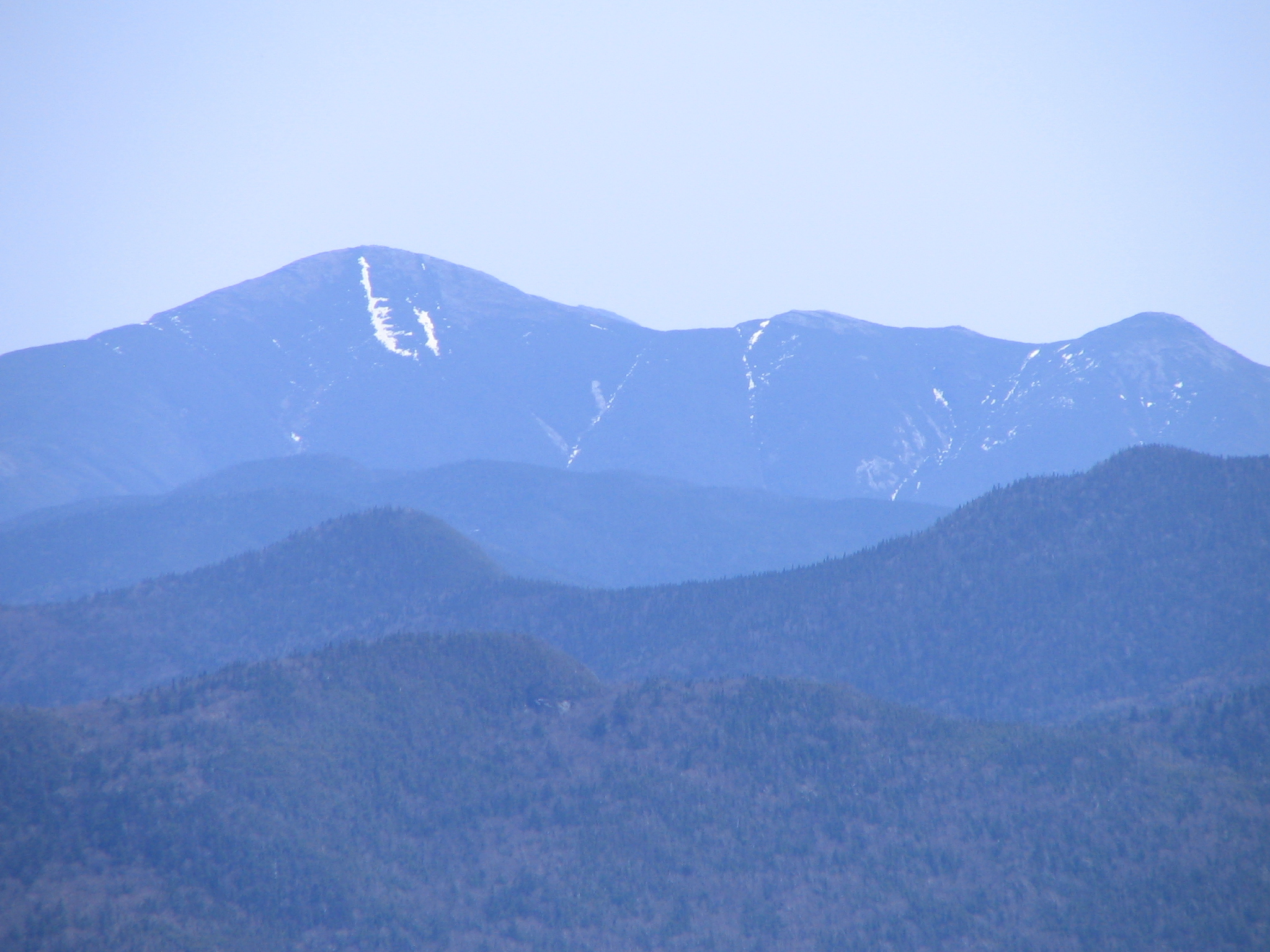
Iroquois Peak (right), Algonquin (left) from Ampersand
