= Porter Mountain =

Mountain in New York, United States

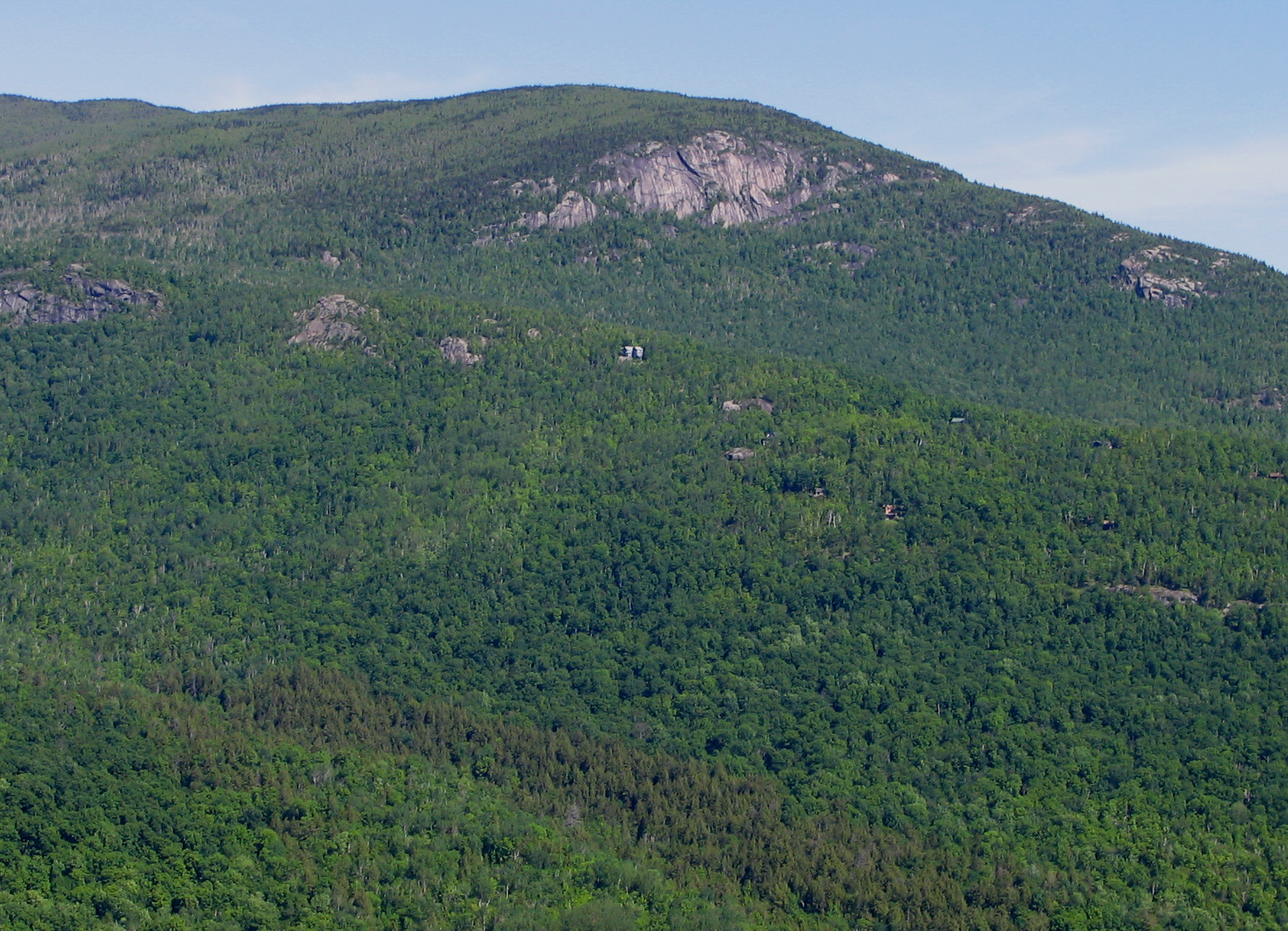
- Porter Mountain from Rooster Comb Mountain

Highest point
- Elevation: 4,059 ft (1,237 m) NGVD 29
- Listing: Adirondack High Peaks 38th
- Coordinates: 44°12′45″N 73°51′13″W

Geography
- Location within New York Adirondack Park Location within the United States
- Location: Keene, New York, U.S.
- Parent range: Adirondacks
- Topo map: USGS Keene Valley

Climbing
- First ascent: 1875 by Ed Phelps and Noah Porter
- Easiest route: Hike

Porter Mountain is a mountain in the Adirondacks in the U.S. state of New York. It is the thirty-eight highest of the Adirondack High Peaks, with an elevation of 4,059 feet (1,237 m). The mountain is located in the town of Keene in Essex County. It is named after Noah Porter, a president of Yale University, who made the first recorded ascent with trail guide Ed Phelps in 1875. It was previously called West Mountain.

A trail to the summit of Porter Mountain begins on New York State Route 73, 6.8 miles (10.9 km) from the center of Keene and 4.5 miles (7.2 km) from the Adirondak Loj road. The trail continues 2.1 miles (3.4 km) to an intersection with a trail to the nearby peak of Cascade Mountain. The trail to Porter Mountain continues to the right and descends to a col before ascending to the summit, for a total one-way distance of 2.8 miles (4.5 km) and ascent of 1,960 feet (600 m). This route is currently being replaced with a longer, 4.3 miles (6.9 km) trail, beginning at the Mount Van Hoevenberg trailhead. As of 2025, the new trail remains under construction.

A second route to Porter Mountain from Marcy Airfield follows the yellow-blazed Ridge Trail. Beginning at the overflow parking lot for the Garden Parking Lot on New York State Route 73, this trail passes Marcy Airfield and goes over the summit of Blueberry Mountain before arriving at the summit of Porter Mountain. This route has a one-way distance of 4.4 miles (7.1 km) and ascent of 3,275 feet (998 m).

A third trail to Porter Mountain from the Garden Parking Lot has been closed since 2019.
