= Adirondack Fire =

U.S. wildfire in 1903

- Location: Adirondack Park and Catskill regions, New York State

Statistics
- Burned area: 600,000 acres (240,000 ha)

Ignition
- Cause: A farmer in Lake Placid lost control of a fallow fire, which was spread due to drought and dry weather conditions.

Adirondack Fire, the Great Fire of 1903, was a wildfire comprising 643 fires in Adirondack and Catskill region, New York, that started on Monday, April 20, 1903. The fire lasted for six weeks. It burned a total area of 600,000 acres, mainly in Adirondack Forest. There were no human deaths, but it killed fish, trees, and deer and damaged properties.

== Origin ==
In April, a farmer in Lake Placid lost control of a fallow fire. The fire was fueled by a 72-day-long drought, scarce rainfall, dried leaves, and vegetation. Other factors that aided the spread of the fire included 8 inches less snowfall than the ten-year-average, and rainfall after April 17 was 0.2 inches, the least ever recorded. Fires in other parts were ignited by sparks due to wood and coal-fueled trains and logging.

== Description ==
The center of the Great Fire of 1903 was Lake Placid, which spread at a rate of 8 miles in two hours. The high winds spread the fire to a tract 6 miles long by 3 miles in width. It spread to as far as 150 miles south from where it originated. It covered areas including Schroon Lake, Lake George, Olmsteadville, Newcomb, Ausable Forks, Saranac Lake, and Clintonville. 6,487 men and women were fighting the fire in Adirondack. There were few fire prevention measures and no mechanized equipment. The telephone and telegraph lines were all down. It burned 14,000 acres in Lake Placid and killed every tree in the region. 40,000 acres in Rockfeller Preserve near Paul Smith were destroyed.

Loon Lake House in Loon Lake was under threat, and the White Face Inn of Lake Placid was completely surrounded by fire. Fire in Keene Valley burned nine miles from Cascade to St. Hubert's Inn. 17,000 acres in towns of Keene and Elizabethtown were burned. North Hudson lost 18,000 acres, and Nehasane Preserve lost 12,000 acres to the fire. A total area of 600,000 acres was burned due to the fire, out of which more than 400,000 acres belonged to the Adirondack Forest. The cost of firefighting in Lake Placid went over $1 million.

== Consequences ==
All fish in Heart Lake and Big Moose Lake were killed due to the fire. It led to the unemployment of 200 men. Heavy ash fell on New York City and Utica. The total direct loss was $3,500,000.

One-third of the forests on and around Giant Mountain and Rocky Peak Ridge were burned by the fires, which stripped the topsoil down to bedrock and left the peaks bare of plants or soil. Exposed rock remains at the peaks of the mountains today.

The 1903 fire and smaller subsequent fires in 1908 and 1909 motivated the New York government to allocate more resources to fire prevention, fire detection, and fire fighting in the Adirondacks. Fire towers were built on several mountains in the 1910s to monitor fires. The lumber industry was also regulated to prevent the accumulation of slash.
