= Pitchoff Mountain =

Mountain in New York, United States

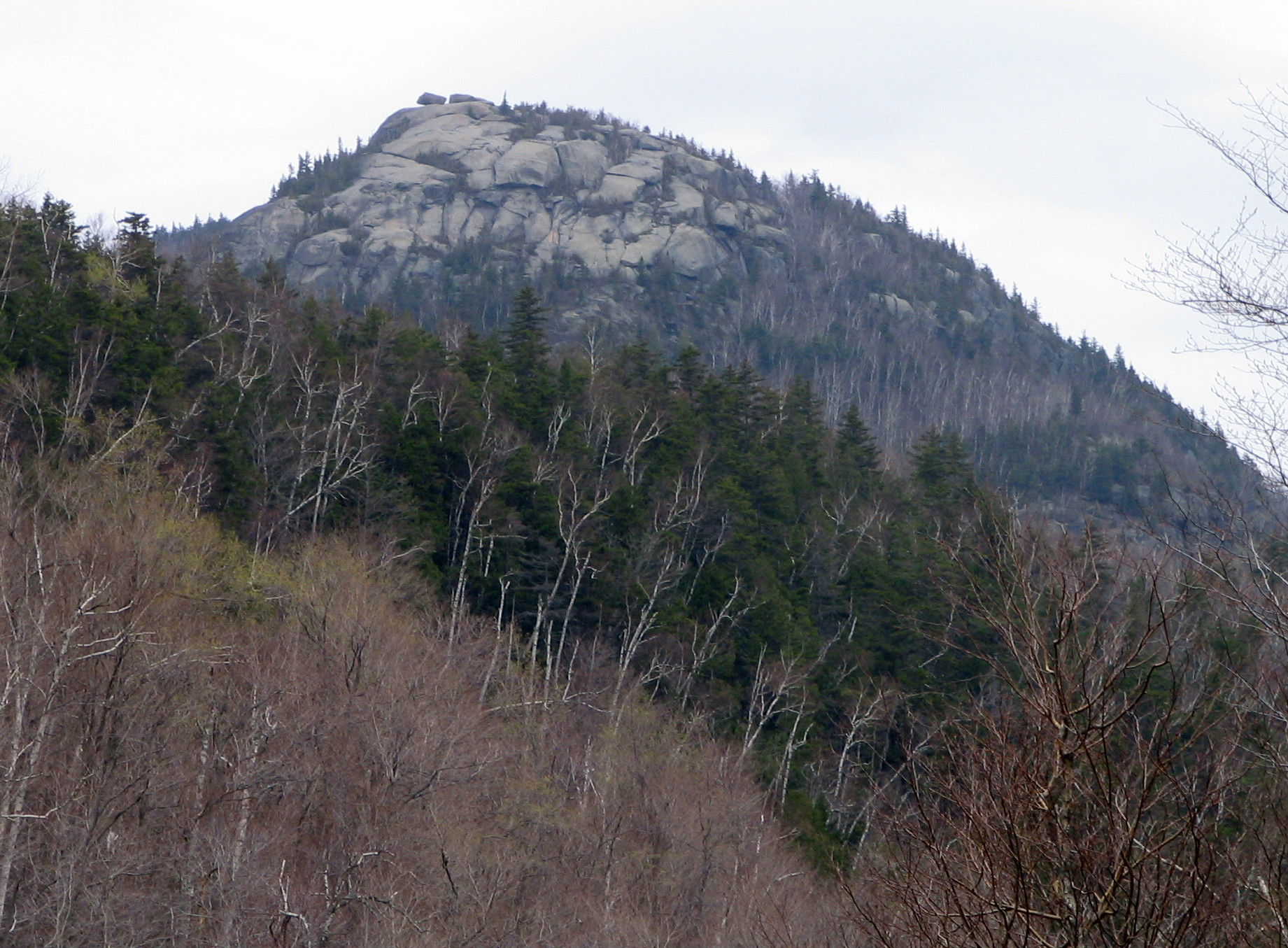
- Pitchoff Mountain from NY 73

Highest point
- Elevation: 3,600 ft (1,100 m)
- Prominence: 1,135 ft (346 m)
- Coordinates: 44°14′15″N 73°52′39″W

Geography
- Location within New York Adirondack Park Location within the United States
- Location: Keene / North Elba, New York, U.S.
- Parent range: Adirondacks
- Topo map: USGS Keene Valley

Pitchoff Mountain is a 3,600-foot (1,097 m) mountain opposite Cascade Mountain on NY 73 west of Keene Valley in Essex County, New York, in the US. There are two summits; the higher summit is viewless, but the northern summit, at 3,323 feet (1,013 m) offers 360 degree views of the nearby Cascade Lakes, the High Peaks of the Adirondacks, and, in clear weather, the Green Mountains of Vermont. There is a 5.2-mile (8.4 km) hiking trail that starts on Route 73 west of the Cascade Lakes, climbs 2.0 miles (3.2 km) to the blind summit, then traverses the nearly two-mile summit ridge to the northern summit before descending 1.4 miles (2.3 km) to Route 73 east of the Lakes, 2.7 miles (4.3 km) east of the starting point.

== See also ==
- List of mountains in New York
