= Adirondak Loj =

Historic lodge in North Elba, Essex County, New York

Coordinates: 44°10.95′N 73°58′W

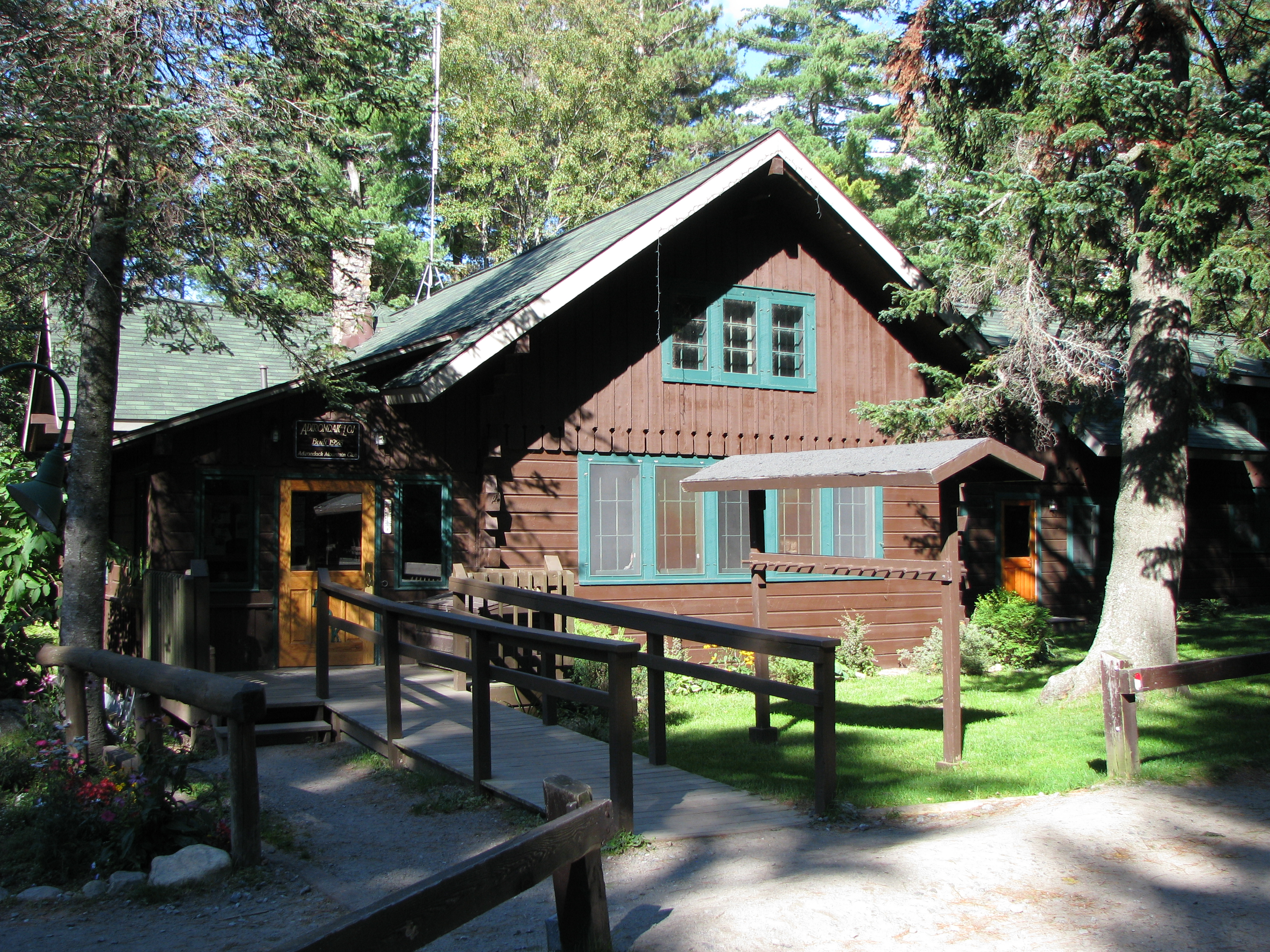
The Loj, rebuilt in 1928

The Adirondak Loj (pronounced "Adirondack Lodge") is a historic lodge in North Elba, Essex County, New York. It is near Lake Placid in the Adirondack Mountains. The current facility, located on the shore of Heart Lake, was built in 1927 and is owned and operated by ADK (Adirondack Mountain Club). The Loj property hosts the trailhead of the popular Van Hoevenberg Trail, which leads to Mount Marcy and Algonquin Peak, the two highest points in the state.

Accommodations include private rooms and hostel-style bunkrooms, with a buffet breakfast included and dinner available by reservation. There are also campsites, lean-tos, and canvas tents available on the property at the Wilderness Campground, which is also managed by ADK.

The Loj sits on a private protected area of 706 acres that includes Heart Lake and Mount Jo; the preserve is owned and managed by ADK.

== History ==
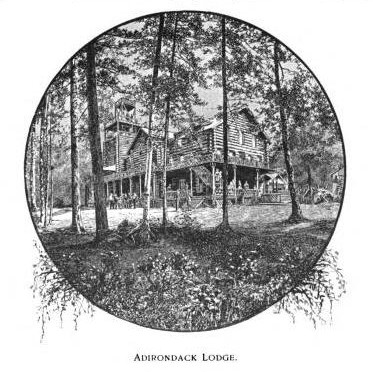
Van Hoevenberg's original Lodge that burned in 1903

Currently in its second iteration, the original Adirondack Lodge was designed by Henry Van Hoevenberg, one of the early trailblazers of the Adirondack High Peaks region and namesake of Mount Van Hoevenberg. The main draw to the Adirondack Lodge was its proximity to Algonquin and Marcy, which had trails cut up to their summits by Van Hoevenberg himself. It opened in 1890, and was well known for its beautiful vistas and colorful fireside storytelling by Van Hoevenberg.

Eventually, due to near constant financial troubles, Van Hoevenberg was forced to sell the property in 1895, though he would remain on as a caretaker until 1898. During this time, the property changed hands several times before eventually ending up under the stable ownership of the Lake Placid Club in 1900. A member of the Lake Placid Club at that point, Van Hoevenberg found himself once again as a caretaker at his beloved lodge. However, disaster hit on June 3, 1903, when the entire structure was consumed in a catastrophic fire that swept Essex County. It was replaced by the present structure, designed by Saranac Lake architect William G. Distin, in 1927.

=== Spelling ===
The spelling of the building's name was changed from its original "Adirondack Lodge" to "Adirondak Loj" by a previous owner, Melvil Dewey, founder of the Lake Placid Club, creator of the Dewey Decimal System and ardent advocate of spelling reform.
