= Vanderwhacker Mountain Wild Forest =

New York State Forest

Coordinates: 43°53′54″N 74°05′46″W

- IUCN category Ib (wilderness area)
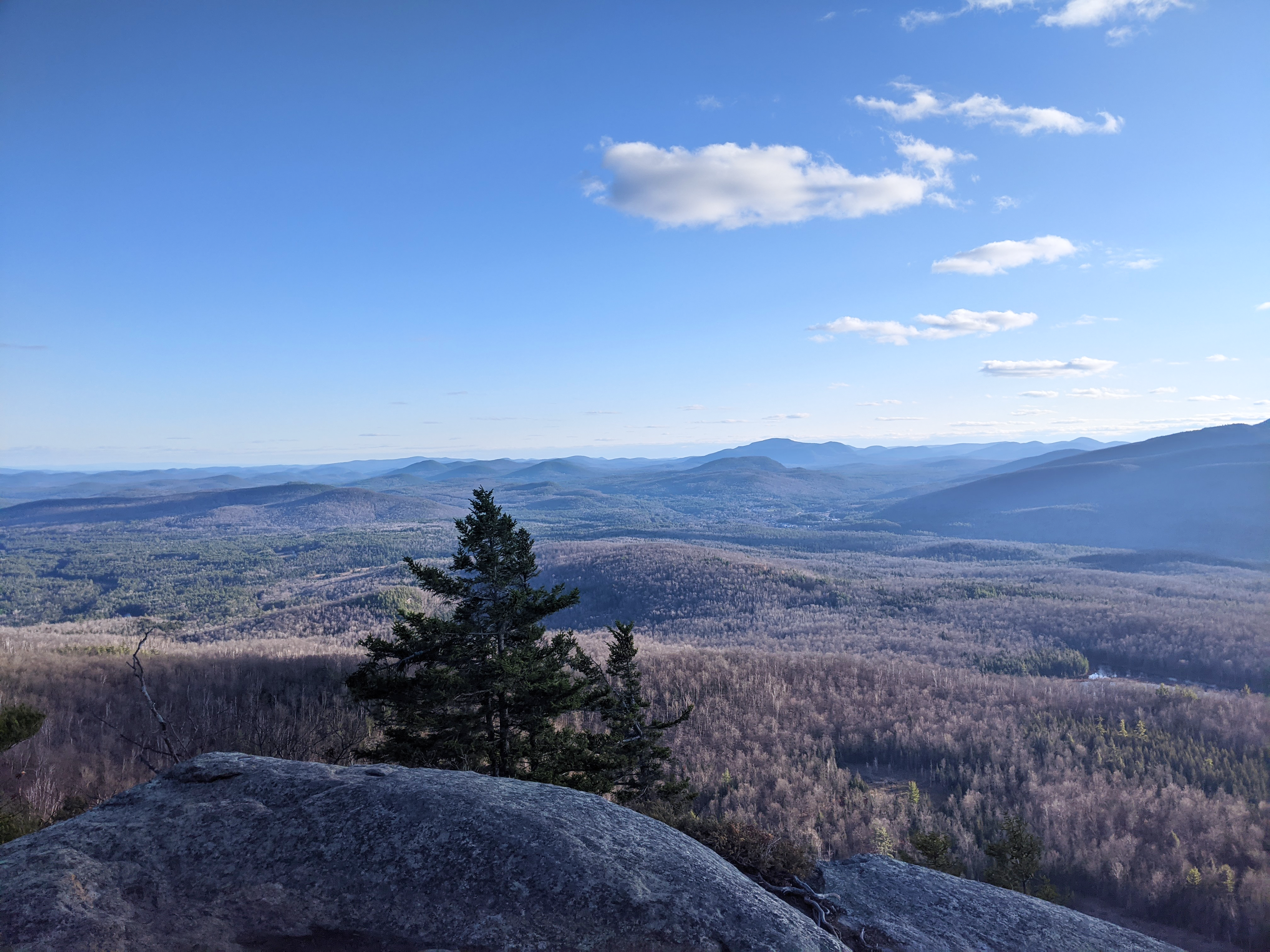
- View from DEC Moxham Mountain Trail in the southern part of the forest preserve
- Interactive map of Vanderwhacker Mountain Wild Forest
- Location: New York, United States of America
- Nearest city: Minerva
- Area: 91,854 acres (371.72 km^{2})
- Governing body: New York State Department of Environmental Conservation

The Vanderwhacker Mountain Wild Forest is a 91,854-acre (143.5 sq mi; 371.7 km^{2}) tract made up of almost two dozen non-contiguous parcels that are designated as Wild Forest by the New York State Department of Environmental Conservation in the central Adirondack Park. The area contains 44 ponds and small lakes, as well as portions of the Hudson and Boreas Rivers. The area is accessible via New York State Route 28 and supports hiking, birding, snowmobiling, Nordic skiing, hunting, camping, canoeing, and fishing.

At 3,389 feet (1,033 m), Vanderwhacker Mountain is the highest in the Wild Forest with a developed foot trail, and fourth highest overall. Because of its isolated location, it provides some of the best views of the High Peaks from the south in the park, as well as views of the Hudson River. There are also trails to Stony Pond, Lester Flow, and the Boreas River.

Hiking trails are planned to Moxham Mountain and Wolf Pond, along with trails that will connect the visitor interpretive center at Newcomb to Santanoni Preserve, and the reopening of Nordic ski trails connecting to Little Gore near the village of North Creek. Snowmobile trails are planned between Minerva and Newcomb, and between Pottersville and Schroon Lake.

== See also ==
- List of New York wild forests
