= Lake Harris Campground =

Human settlement in New York, United States of America

Coordinates: 43°58′46″N 74°07′50″W

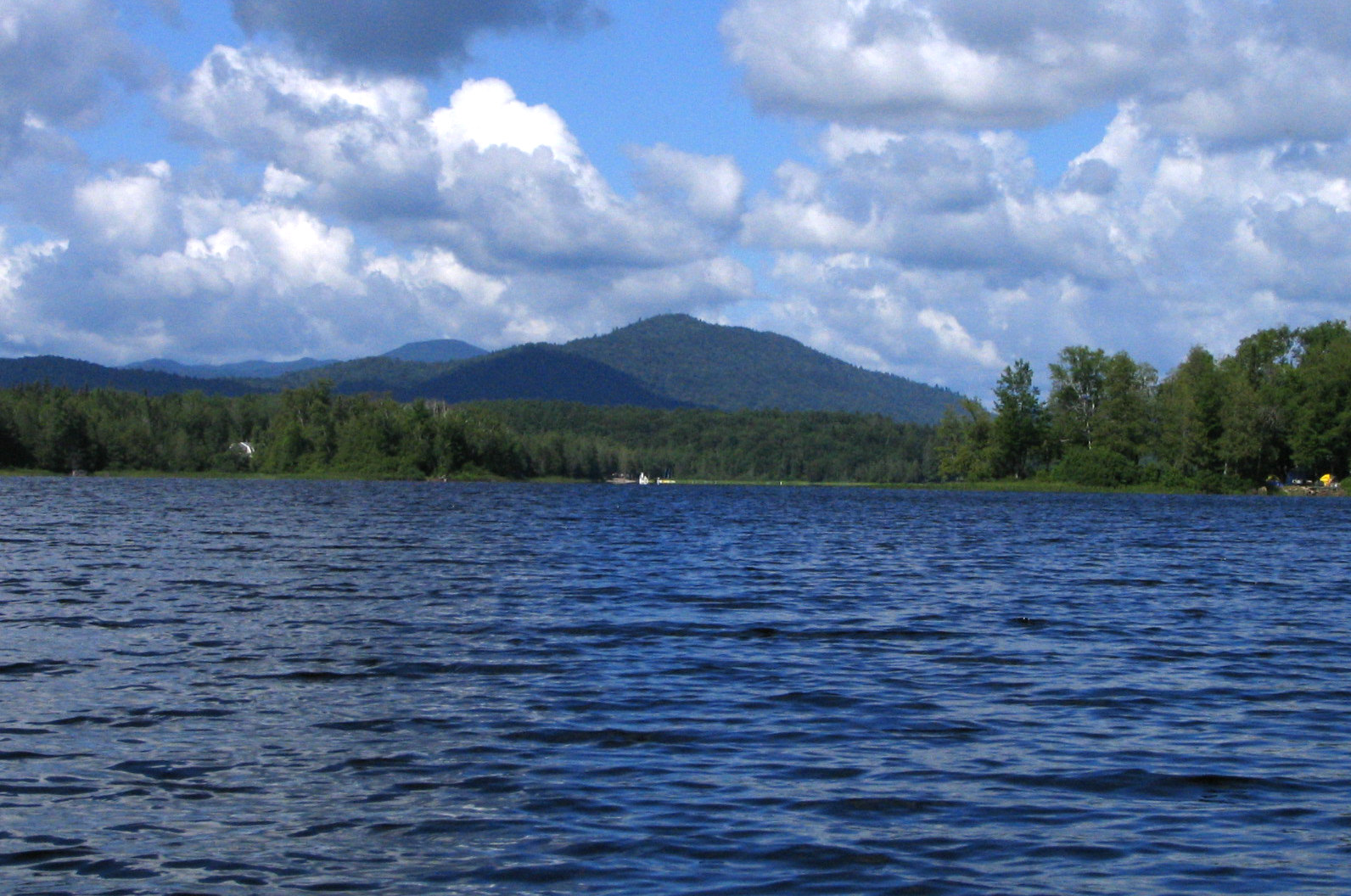
Harris Lake in Newcomb.

Lake Harris Campground is a campground operated by the New York State Department of Environmental Conservation (DEC) on Harris Lake in the town of Newcomb, New York in the Adirondacks. The campground is open from mid-May through early September.

275-acre (1.11 km^{2}) Harris Lake empties into the Hudson River near its beginning just above the Hudson Gorge. Boating is a popular activity, and rowboats and canoes may be rented; fish species include walleye, northern pike, small and large mouth bass, and yellow perch.

Hiking trails are available in the nearby Santanoni Preserve and Vanderwhacker Wild Forest Area; a trail head for trails to the High Peaks Wilderness Area at Tahawus and trails to the summits of Goodnow and Vanderwhacker Mountains are nearby. There are nature trails at the Visitors Center in Newcomb. A picnic area is available, but there is no swimming beach in the campground.

A monument commemorating Theodore Roosevelt's midnight ride upon learning that President William McKinley had been shot is located to the east of the campground.
