= Gooley Club =

Hunting and fishing club in New York, US

- U.S. National Register of Historic Places
- New York State Register of Historic Places
- Location within New York Location within the United States
- Location: Minerva, New York
- Coordinates: 43°52′16″N 74°14′48″W
- Area: 15,182 acres (6,144 ha)
- Built: c. 1930–50
- Architectural style: Adirondack architecture
- Demolished: 2018–21
- NRHP reference No.: 100002383
- NYSRHP No.: 04104.000089

Significant dates
- Added to NRHP: May 4, 2018
- Designated NYSRHP: February 14, 2018

The Gooley Club was a private hunting and fishing club in the towns of Minerva, Newcomb and Indian Lake, New York, United States. Located on two large parcels around the Hudson River and the Essex Chain of Lakes in the Adirondack Mountains, it had received hunting and fishing tourism since the 19th century. The club was officially formed in 1947 on land leased from lumber company Finch, Pruyn and Company, which maintained the leases until it sold its Adirondack holdings in 2007. It operated until 2018, when its lease with the state of New York—which had acquired the land for its Forest Preserve—terminated. Despite an effort to preserve the club and its 2018 listing on the National Register of Historic Places, at the end of the lease, its facilities were demolished and removed between 2018 and 2021.

== Description ==
The Gooley Club consisted of two non-contiguous areas spanning a combined 15,000 acres (6,100 ha), mostly in Minerva and its fellow Essex County town of Newcomb and Indian Lake in Hamilton County. The Outer Gooley Club was the smaller of the two parcels at 1,176 acres (476 ha), with the Inner Gooley Club accounting for most of the acreage. The club was accessed solely from New York State Route 28 in Indian Lake.

The Outer Gooley Club was the original land leased from Finch, Pruyn by the newly formed club. It is located on the west bank of the Hudson River near the discharge of the Indian River, primarily in the town of Minerva. The outer club included a single clubhouse, a dormitory built c. 1930 that originally housed foresters working for Finch, Pruyn. Other than this building, the outer club was entirely undeveloped. The Outer Gooley Clubhouse was a two-story, side-gabled frame structure and measured about 20 feet (6.1 m) by 40 feet (12 m). It had an irregular one-story rear addition and a shed-roofed porch. It was sided with clapboard. This clubhouse included large living and dining rooms and several bedrooms on the second floor. According to historian Richard Longstreth, "the clubhouse gives a now rare sense of Adirondack retreats that were rustic in their simplicity, not their embellishment."

The larger Inner Gooley Club was more developed. It was located in Newcomb and Minerva on Third Lake, the largest of the Essex Chain of Lakes. Access to the inner club was originally solely from Indian Lake, but a road was built from the club to Newcomb in 1953. The inner club included 17 buildings, 14 of which contributed to the Gooley Club's historic character. A main lodge (c. 1930) and a cabin dated back to Finch, Pruyn logging camp use early in the 20th century. The main lodge was a one-story, front-gabled building measuring 20 feet (6.1 m) by 90 feet (27 m) surfaced with live edge siding and an engaged open porch at the east end. It included a kitchen, dining room, caretaker's residence and storage. The property also included a series of cabins, most built c. 1950s but one dating to the club's lumber camp era c. 1930. Docks provided access to boats and access to the camp for floatplanes.

== History ==
The first hunting and fishing camp in the Essex Chain of Lakes for sportsmen visiting the Adirondacks was established in 1866. Michael Gooley, a Canadian logger, and his wife, Olive, assisted with running this club. In 1892, they acquired a farm on the Indian River (later to become the Outer Gooley Club) where they served visiting hunters and fishermen. An early log house burned and was replaced with a wood-frame lodge in 1927.

The Gooleys, along with Arvin Hutchins, who operated the Chain of Lakes camp, sold their land to paper mill operator Finch, Pruyn between 1905 and 1916, but hunting and fishing use continued under lease, informally at first. In 1947—amid a boom in hunting as a postwar recreation and easier road access to the central Adirondacks—a group of people who had enjoyed recreation on the site formed a club in honor of the Gooleys and officially leased the land from Finch, Pruyn. During a 1948 meeting at the Queensbury Hotel in Glens Falls, New York, the 100 club members (membership was capped and always remained near or at its maximum, growing to 120 by the 1980s) agreed to lease the larger Chain of Lakes parcel (the Inner Gooley Club). The success of the Gooley Club leases created a template for other recreational leases of timber company land in the Adirondacks. In addition to hunting and fishing, the club provided swimming, boating, canoeing, mountain biking, hiking and other recreational opportunities to club members and their guests and families. The first women members were welcomed in 2012.

In 2007, the Nature Conservancy purchased 161,000 acres (65,000 ha) of Finch, Pruyn's Adirondack land, including the land leased by the Gooley Club. The Nature Conservancy intended to sell 58,000 acres (23,000 ha) to the state of New York for inclusion in its Forest Preserve, which, due to the "forever wild" constitutional provision establishing the Adirondack Park, would entail the destruction of the club's facilities. Club members proposed the state purchase conservation easements to protect its interests in the land remaining used for wilderness recreation. In 2012, the Nature Conservancy sold the land to the state. The Gooley Club's recreational lease ended in September 2018. The camp buildings were listed on the National Register of Historic Places, and efforts were made to preserve the clubhouse as a museum documenting 20th-century Adirondack hunting camp culture. However, when their lease expired in 2018, club members removed the buildings of the Inner Gooley Club as required, and the land was opened to the public. The Outer Gooley Club was condemned in 2019 by the New York State Department of Environmental Conservation and demolished in 2021.
