= Adirondack Architectural Heritage =

U.S. nonprofit organization

Adirondack Architectural Heritage (AARCH) is a private nonprofit, membership organization dedicated to the preservation of the historic architecture of New York State's Adirondack Park. Their offices are located in the historic Ausable Horse Nail Company office building in Keeseville, New York.

== History ==
AARCH was formed in May 1990 to promote public understanding, appreciation and stewardship of the Adirondacks' architectural heritage. The group was initially headed by Dr. Howard Kirschenbaum, who formed it in an effort to save historic Camp Santanoni, an Adirondack Great Camp, from being destroyed by the state when the land it was on was added to the New York Forest Preserve. The effort was successful, and Santanoni draws more than fifteen thousand visitors a year.
