= Vanderwhacker Mountain =

Mountain in New York, United States

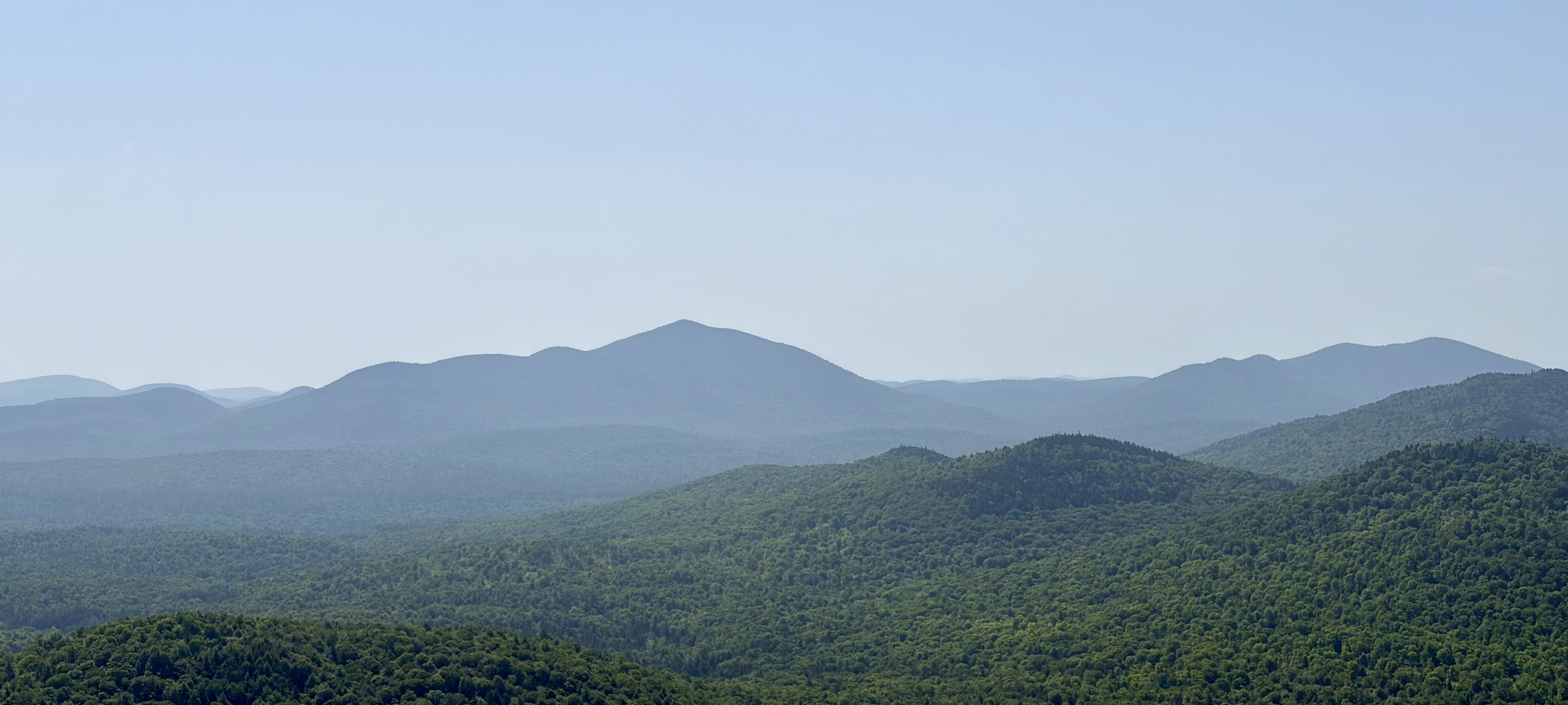
- Vanderwhacker Mountain from Goodnow Mountain

Highest point
- Elevation: 3,389 feet (1,033 m)
- Coordinates: 43°53′54″N 74°05′46″W

Geography
- Location within New York Adirondack Park Location within the United States
- Location: Essex County, New York, U.S.
- Topo map: USGS Vanderwhacker Mountain

Vanderwhacker Mountain is a 3,389-foot-tall (1,033 m) mountain in the Adirondack Mountains region of New York. It is located northeast of Indian Lake and southeast of Newcomb in Essex County. The Vanderwhacker Mountain Fire Observation Station is located on top of the mountain. In May 1911, the Conservation Commission built a wooden fire observation tower on the mountain which was replaced in 1918, with a 35-foot-tall (11 m) metal tower. The tower stopped fire watching operations at the end of the 1988 season.

== History ==
In May 1911, the Conservation Commission built a wooden fire observation tower on the mountain. In 1918, the Conservation Commission replaced it with a 35-foot-tall (11 m) Aermotor LS40 tower. The tower stopped fire watching operations at the end of the 1988 season. The tower was officially closed by the New York State Department of Environmental Conservation in early 1989.
