= Henderson Lake (New York) =

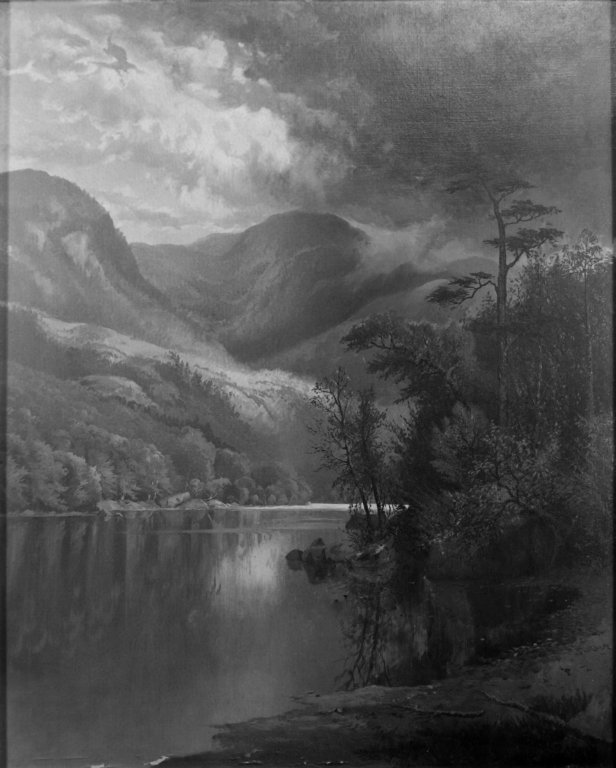
- Henderson Lake circa 1881

- Location within New York Location within the United States
- Location: Newcomb, Essex County, New York
- Coordinates: 44°05′30″N 74°04′01″W
- Lake type: Natural lake, Reservoir
- Primary inflows: Indian Pass Brook, Santononi Brook, Harkness Brook
- Primary outflows: Hudson River
- Basin countries: United States
- Surface area: 281 acres (1.14 km^{2})
- Max. depth: 70 ft (21 m)
- Surface elevation: 1,814 ft (553 m)
- References: https://extapps.dec.ny.gov/docs/fish_marine_pdf/tb519064.pdf

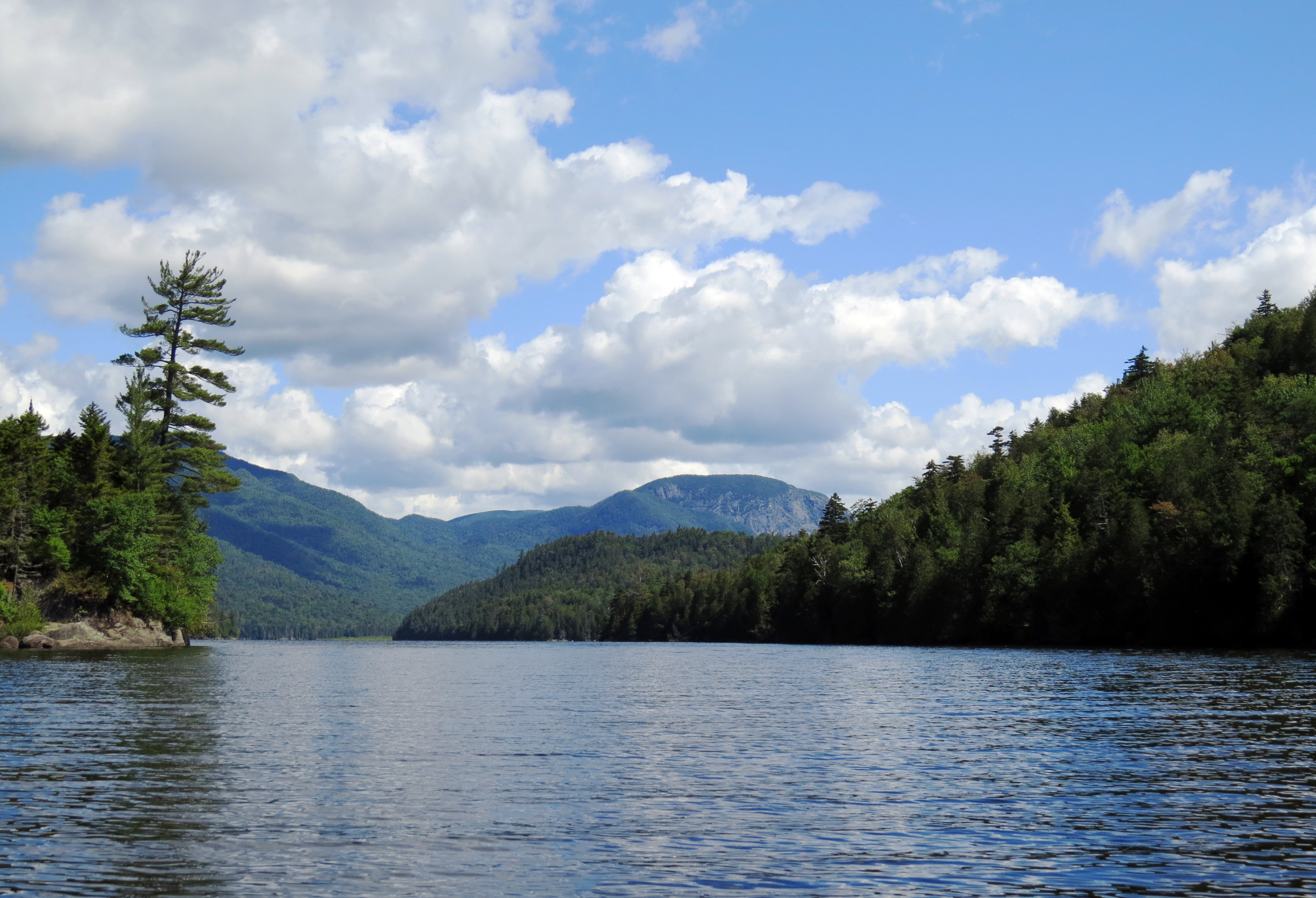
Lake Henderson looking north northwest towards Wallface Mountain

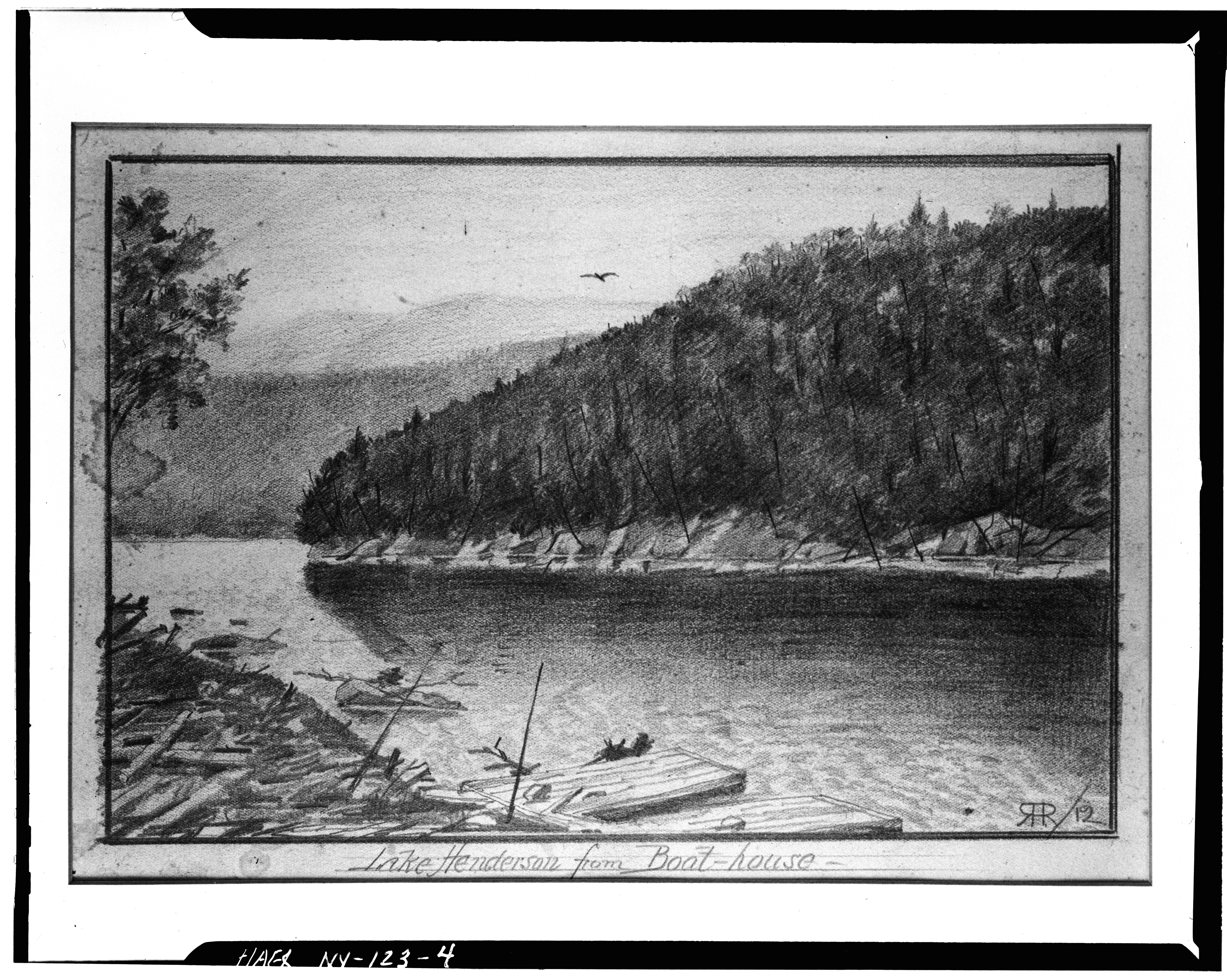
Henderson Lake circa 1914

Henderson Lake is located in the Adirondack Mountains in the town of Newcomb, Essex County, New York in the United States. It was named in 1826 after David Henderson, one of the founders of the Elba Iron Works near Lake Placid, New York, and of the Upper Works at Tahawus, New York. The lake is mainly cited by cartographers as the place where the Hudson River as named officially begins, flowing out of the eastern end and outlet of the lake. Unofficially, the source of the river is traced up Indian Pass Brook and other watercourses to Lake Tear of the Clouds.

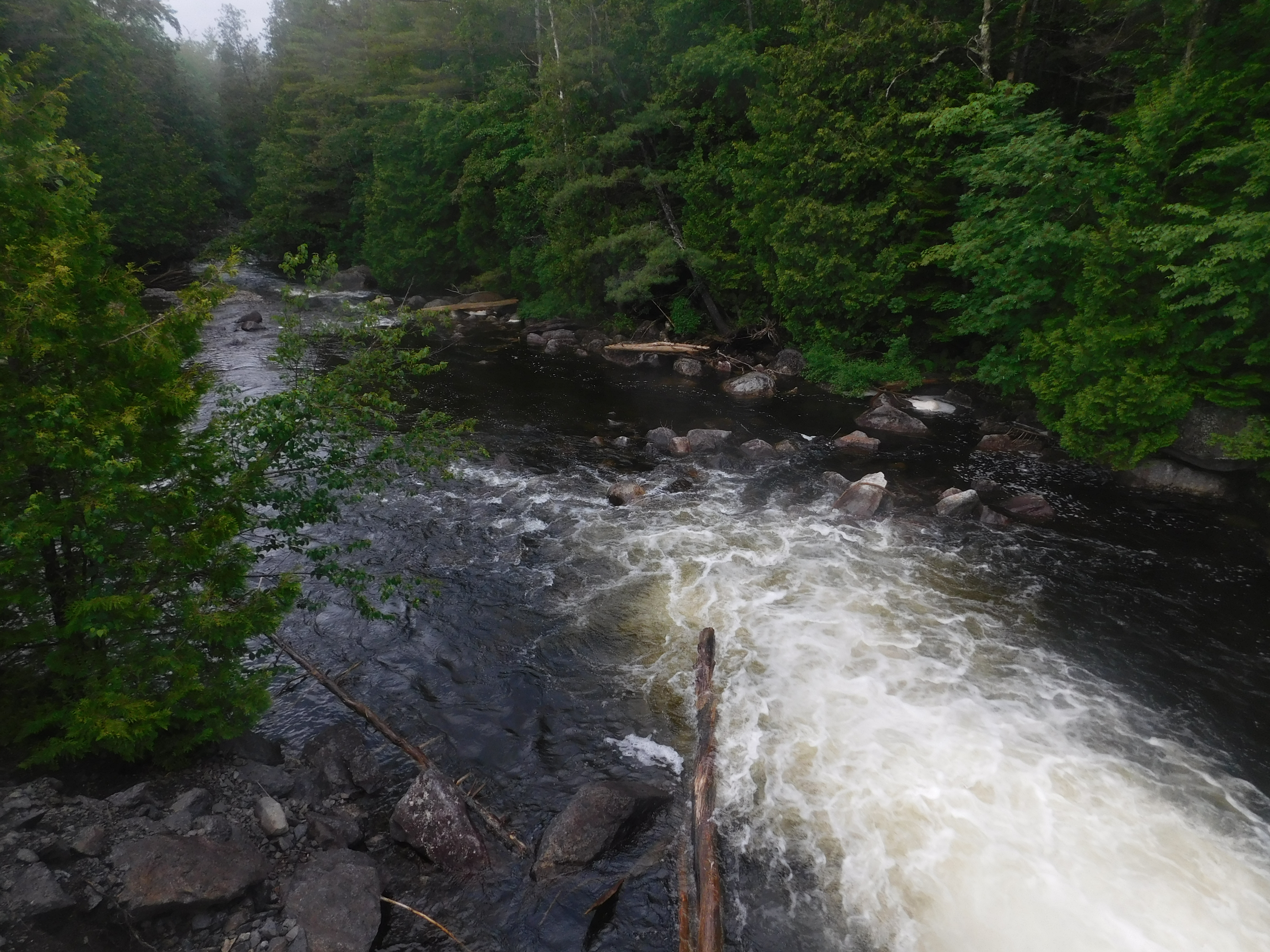
The Hudson River flowing out of Henderson Lake in Tahawus

== Sources ==
- Donaldson, Alfred Lee. "A history of the Adirondacks, volume 1". The Century Co. New York, 1921.
- Stanne, Stephen P., Panetta, Roger G., and Forist, Brian E. "The Hudson: An Illustrated Guide to the Living River". Rutgers University Press, 1996.
