= Olmstedville, New York =

Hamlet in New York, United States

Olmstedville
- Hamlet
- Interactive map of Olmstedville
- Coordinates: 43°46′17.23″N 73°55′52.48″W
- Country: United States
- State: New York
- County: Essex
- Town: Minerva
- Elevation: 1,181 ft (360 m)
- Time zone: UTC−5 (Eastern (EST))
  - Summer (DST): UTC−4 (EDT)
- ZIP Code: 12857
- Area code(s): 518-251 exchange in North Creek, New York
- Location: Adirondack Park

Olmstedville is a hamlet in the town of Minerva in Essex County, New York, United States, in the Adirondack Park.

Historically, it has been the largest settlement in the town of Minerva. Today, it has its own post office, and Minerva Central School is located there. One of two stations of Minerva Fire & Rescue is also located in Olmstedville. The community still remains as the largest hamlet in the town. Telephone service is provided by the 518-251 exchange in North Creek, New York.
