= Wallface Mountain =

Mountain in New York, United States

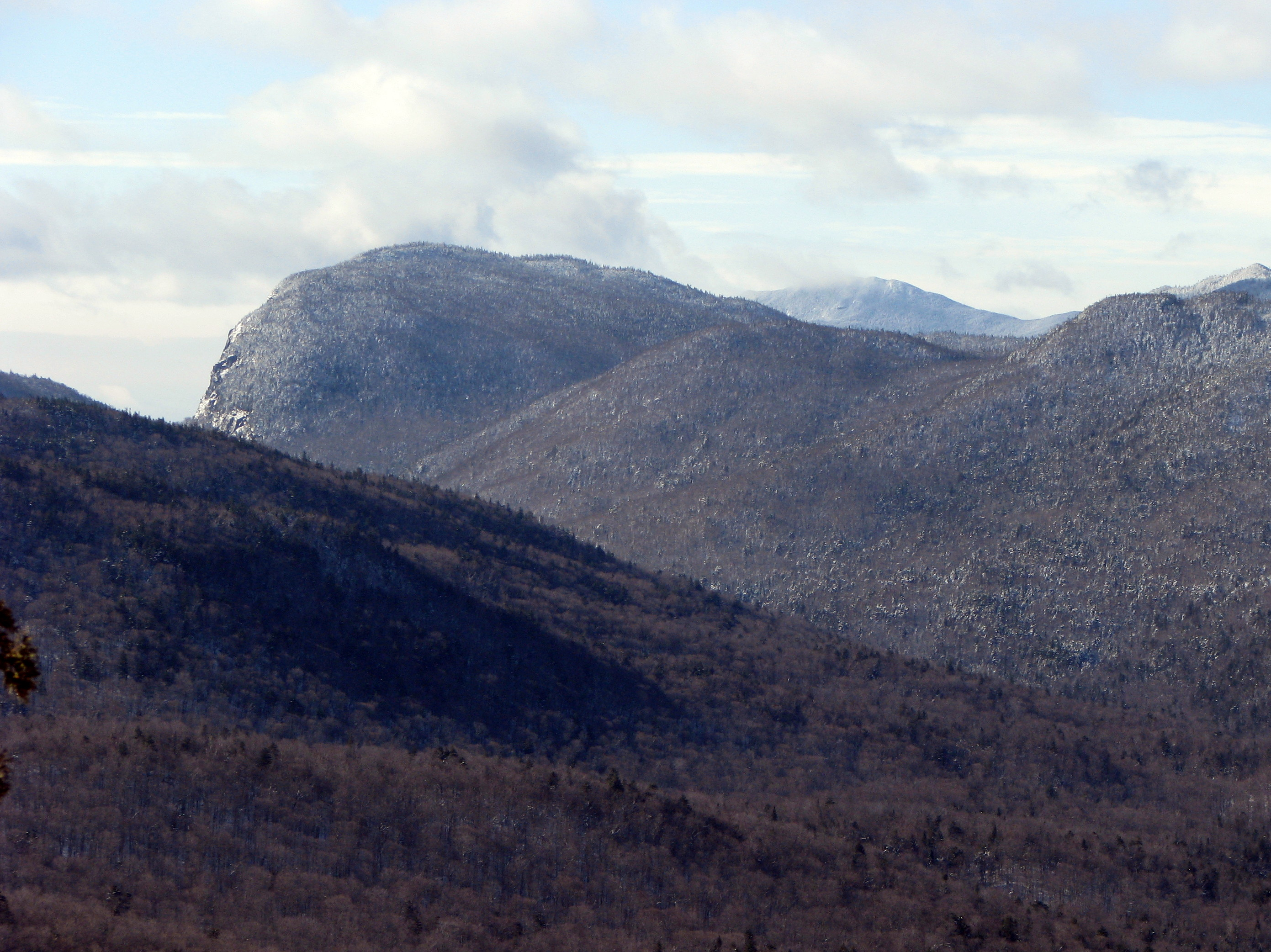
- Wallface Mountain at left, from Mount Jo

Highest point
- Elevation: 1,136 metres (3,727 ft)
- Prominence: 180 m (590 ft)
- Coordinates: 44°8.282′N 74°2.205′W

Geography
- Location within New York Adirondack Park Location within the United States
- Location: North Elba, Essex County, New York, U.S.
- Parent range: Street Range
- Topo map: USGS Ampersand Lake

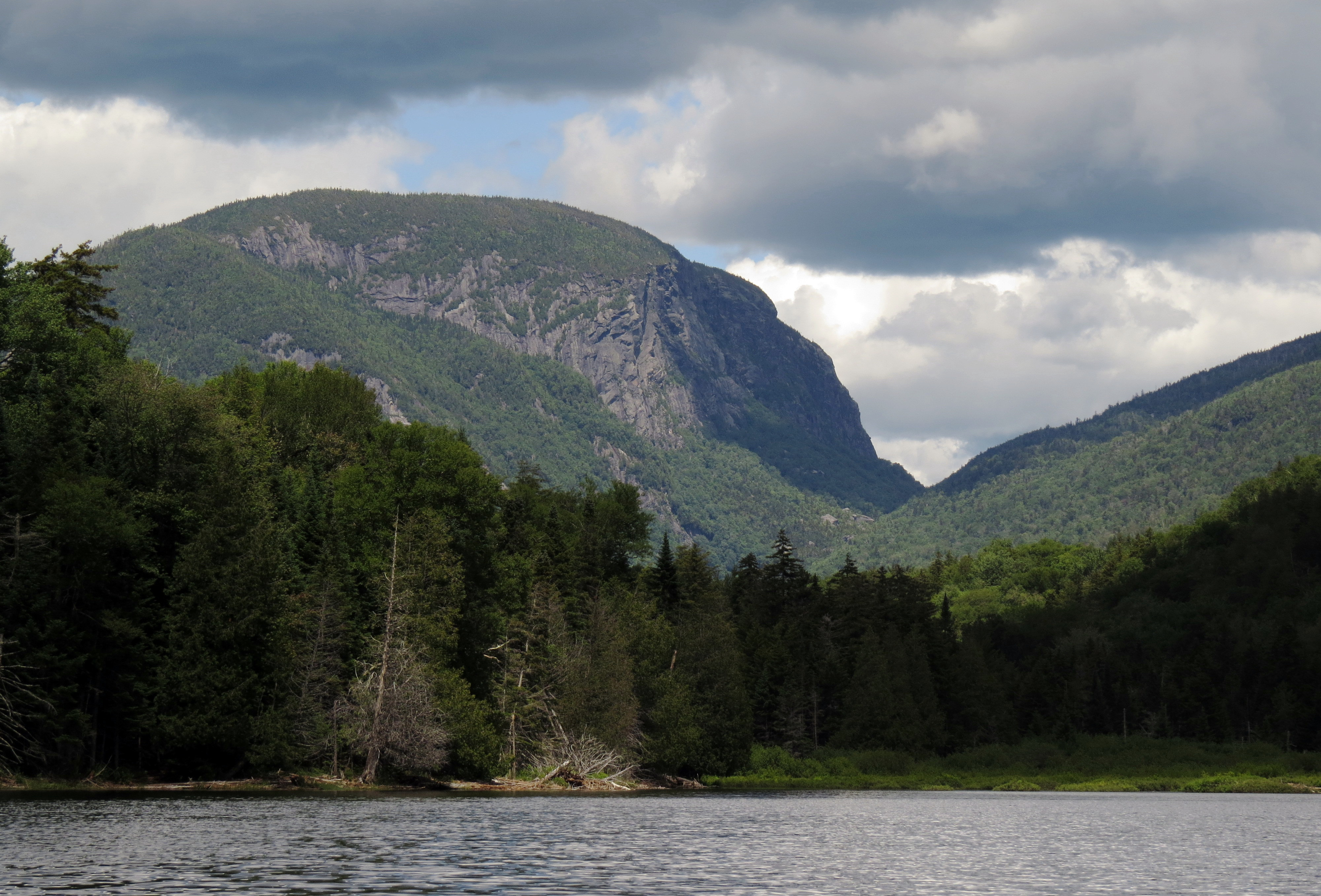
Wallface Mountain looking north northwest from Lake Henderson

Wallface Mountain is a mountain located in Essex County, New York, United States. The mountain is named after the cliff on its southeastern side. Wallface is flanked to the west by MacNaughton Mountain, and faces Mount Marshall to the southeast across Indian Pass.

The southeast and west sides of Wallface Mountain drain into the southern Indian Pass Brook, thence into Henderson Lake, the source of the Hudson River, which drains into New York Bay. The northern slopes of Wallface Mountain drain into the northern Indian Pass Brook, thence into the West Branch of the Ausable River, into Lake Champlain, thence into Canada's Richelieu River, the Saint Lawrence River, and into the Gulf of Saint Lawrence.

The talus deposits under Wallface contain substantial talus caves, including the Touchy Sword of Damocles cave, which at 4,000 metres (13,000 ft) of passage is potentially the longest surveyed talus cave in the world.

Wallface Mountain is within the High Peaks Wilderness Area of New York's Adirondack Park.

== See also ==
- List of mountains in New York

== Notes ==
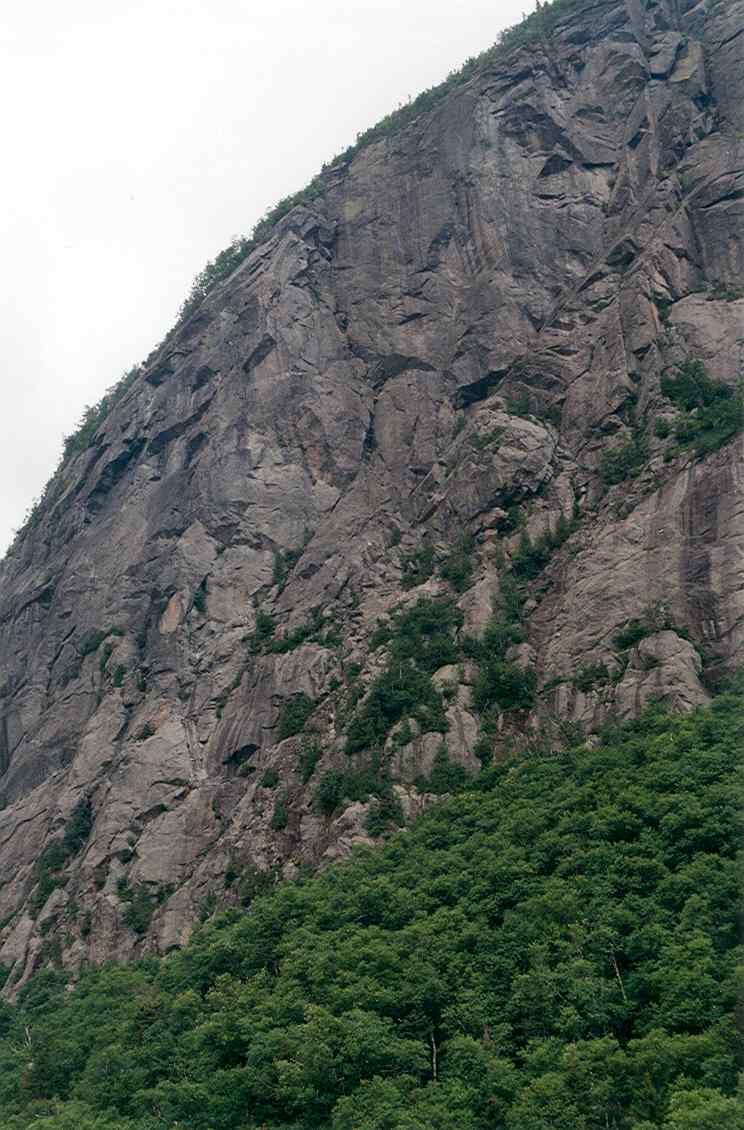
Wallface's cliff, from Indian Pass
