= Mount Adams (New York) =

Mountain in Essex County of New York, United States

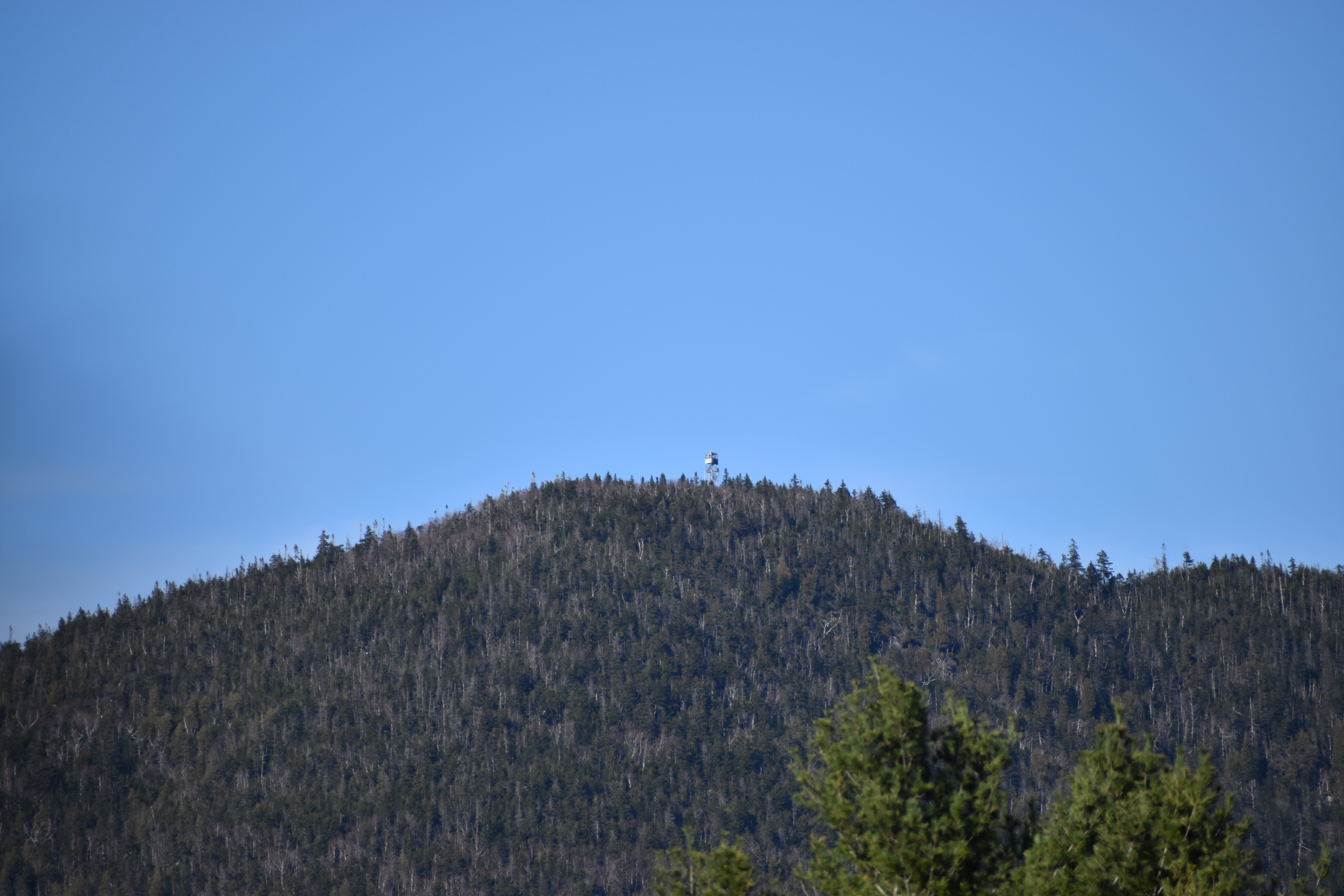
- Mount Adams with fire tower visible on top

Highest point
- Elevation: 3,520 ft (1,073 m)
- Coordinates: 44°05′12″N 74°01′33″W

Geography
- Location within New York Adirondack Park Location within the United States
- Location: Newcomb, Essex County, New York, United States
- Parent range: Adirondacks
- Topo map: USGS Mount Adams

Climbing
- Easiest route: Hike

Mount Adams is a 3,520-foot-tall (1,070 m) mountain located in Essex County of New York. Atop the mountain is the Mount Adams Fire Observation Station, added to the National Register of Historic Places in 2006.

== History ==
The first fire lookout structure built on the mountain was a wooden tower that was built by the Conservation Commission in 1912. In 1917, the Conservation Commission replaced it with a 47-foot-tall (14 m) steel Aermotor LS40 tower. The tower was ceased fire lookout operations at the end of the 1971 season.

In 2003, the Outdoor Space Institute (OSI) purchased about 10,000 acres (40 km^{2}) of land from NL Industries, known as the Tahawus Tract. Within this area is the fire tower, observer's cabin and other out buildings. It was planned that a large portion of this property would be transferred to the State of New York and subsequently become part of the High Peaks Wilderness Area, requiring that the tower and related structures be removed. After considerable pressure, the OSI and the DEC agreed that the surrounding lands would be transferred to the State with the exception of the tower and cabin sites. The tower and cabin would be retained by OSI so that historic preservation and restoration work could be done. Restoration work began on the tower by the DEC through AmeriCorp volunteers of the Student Conservation Association. In early April 2006, the Adirondack Park Agency gave final approval to the plan for the Tahawus Tract.

The observers cabin on Adams, which was built in 1922, is the oldest surviving in the state and one of the first of a standard design established by the Conservation Commission that same year. In September 2007, a friends group from ADKHighPeaks.com began a restoration project on the tower. Mount Adams fire tower now appears on the National Historic Lookout Register.
