= Mount Adams Fire Observation Station =

- U.S. National Register of Historic Places
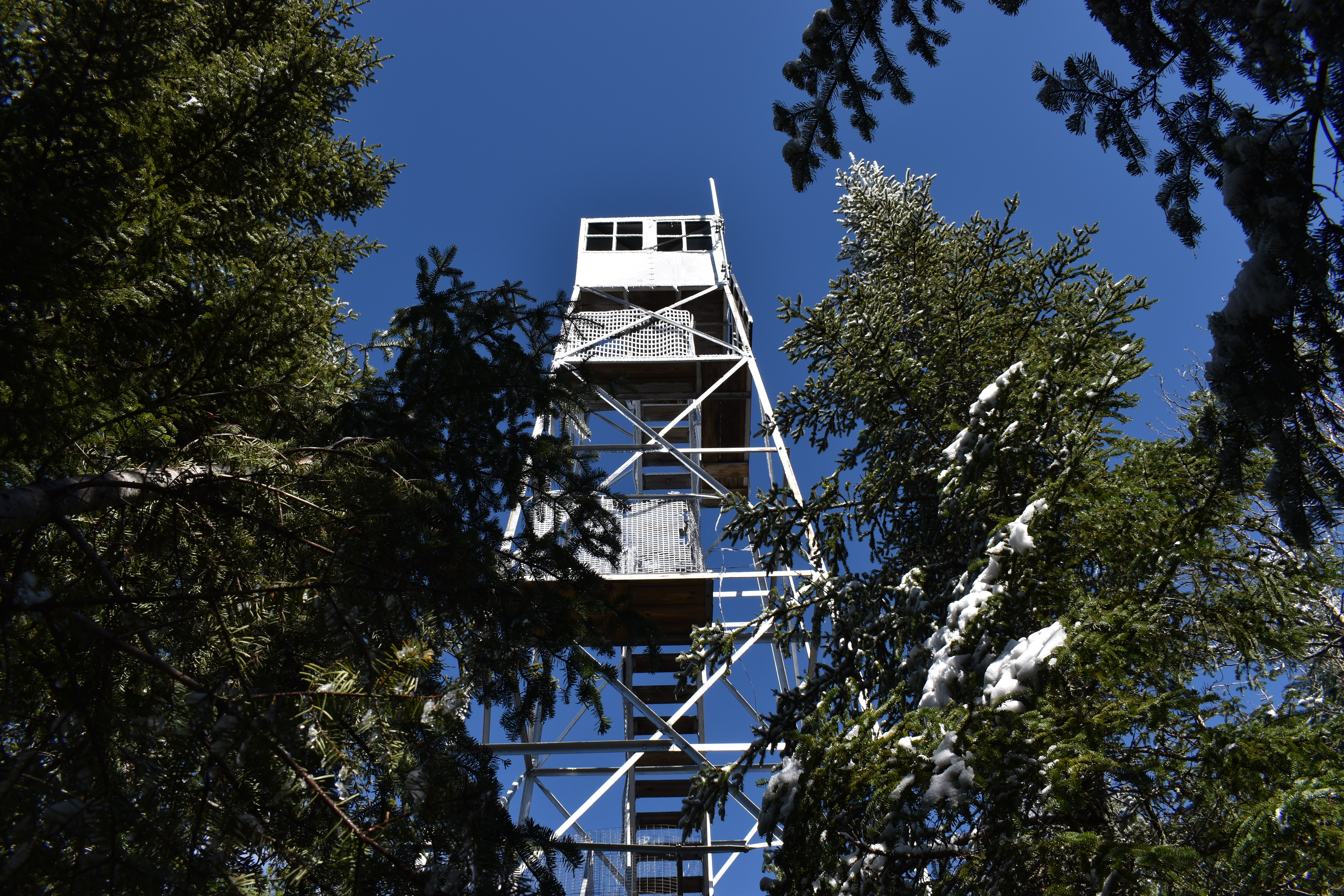
- Fire tower May 2021

- Location within New York Location within the United States
- Location: Mount Adams, Newcomb, New York
- Coordinates: 44°5′12.75″N 74°1′31.8″W
- Area: 7.5 acres (3.0 ha)
- Built: 1917
- Architect: AerMotor Co.
- Architectural style: Utilitarian
- MPS: Fire Observation Stations of New York State Forest Preserve MPS
- NRHP reference No.: 06000253
- Added to NRHP: April 12, 2006

The Mount Adams Fire Observation Station is a historic fire observation station located on Mount Adams at Newcomb in Essex County, New York. The station and contributing resources include a 56-foot-tall (17 m), steel frame lookout tower erected in 1917, a foot trail leading up the 3,250 foot summit, and the 1922 observers cabin with shed and privy. The tower is a prefabricated structure built by the Aermotor Corporation to provide a front line of defense in preserving the Adirondack Park from the hazards of forest fires.

It was added to the National Register of Historic Places in 2006.
