= Queensbury Hotel =

Historic hotel in Glens Falls, New York

- U.S. National Register of Historic Places
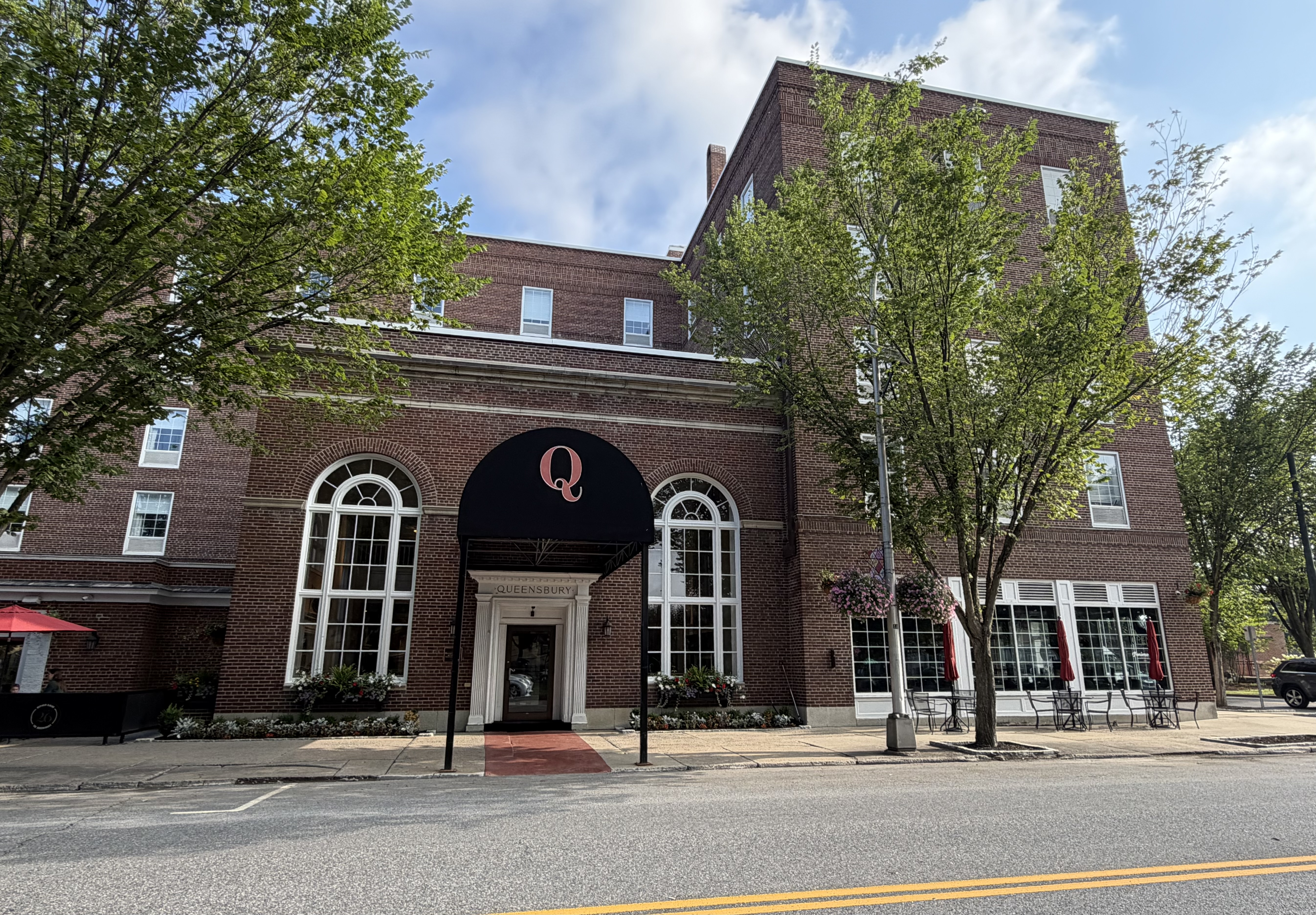
- The Queensbury Hotel in 2026

- Location within New York Location within the United States
- Location: 88 Ridge St., Glens Falls, New York
- Coordinates: 43.3119°N 73.6442°W
- Built: 1926
- NRHP reference No.: 100002924
- Added to NRHP: September 14, 2018

The Queensbury Hotel, in Glens Falls, New York, is a historic hotel built in 1926.

It featured Colonial Revival architecture in its exterior, mahogany in its interior styling and room doors, and had more than 200 rooms. In 2021, after renovations including in 2019, it has 125 rooms and suites as well as the Queen's Ballroom and other event spaces and amenities. It includes an "upscale" bar/restaurant, Fenimore's Pub. Along with the town of Queensbury surrounding Glens Falls, it most likely was named for Queen Charlotte.

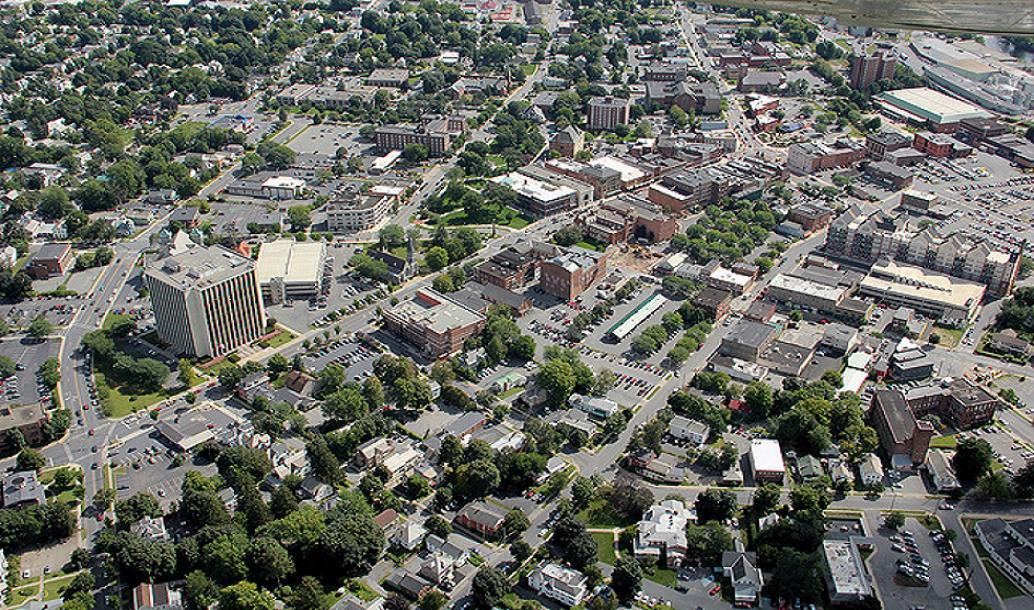
Hotel in downtown Glens Falls in 2008, on right side of City Park in upper center of photo

The hotel has long been part of the Glens Falls' fabric, being located in its downtown, on Ridge Street (New York State Route 9L). It faces across City Park to the historic City Hall building. The Paramount Theatre, once one of three movie theaters in Glens Falls, formerly across Ridge Street from the hotel, was open from the 1930s to the 1970s, and was ultimately demolished in 1979.

== History ==
By 1916, it became a goal of local boosters (businessmen, the Chamber of Commerce, and city officials) to have a hotel built. It would serve tourists going to and from the Adirondacks, (Note: A modern-day booster website says about Glens Falls: "Though technically not in the Adirondack Park, it is the gateway city to the park and mountains and is the largest city in the North Country next to Plattsburgh. Though it has seen better days and has experienced many gut wrenching old plant closings, it is still a well maintained place, unlike some notorious downstate horror stories. The downtown district has the usual old urban area makeover look and is reasonably pleasant, since those older buildings were well built with style." -- Glens Falls & Queensbury, at AdirondackNorthway.com) and non-local businessmen, and it would serve as a community center. On March 6, 1924, at the Glens Falls Insurance Co., 100 businessmen met and unanimously voted to organize a Glens Falls Hotel Corporation and to build a $600,000 modern hotel. Both the Glens Falls Insurance company and Finch, Pruyn and Company subscribed to $50,000 worth of stock. Enthusiastic efforts led to $440,000, equivalent to about $6.6 million in 2019, being raised in only eight days. Construction began later that year.

Since then, a number of renovations have added guestrooms and meeting rooms and more.

During 2009 to 2014 the hotel's business was boosted by activity of the Glens Falls' Adirondack Phantoms, an American Hockey League team which played at Glens Falls Civic Center. In 2010 it hosted Jerry D'Amigo and team-mates of the Toronto Maple Leafs, who were in town to play the Phantoms.

It was bought in March 2016 by self-styled "Adirondack Region entrepreneur" Ed Moore.

It became a member of the Historic Hotels of America program of the National Trust for Historic Preservation in 2017.

In 2018 it was listed on the National Register of Historic Places, with reference number 100002924.

== Other ==
In 2020 it was election night headquarters for U.S. Representative Elise Stefanik, who gave a victory speech on November 3.

In 2021 it has been difficult for the Lake George region's tourism industry, including this hotel, to hire up post-Covid, for both seasonal and permanent employees. In April the manager of The Queensbury Hotel and of the Fairfield Inn & Suites reported there were 60 positions unfilled, between the two hotels.
