= Minerva, New York =

- Town
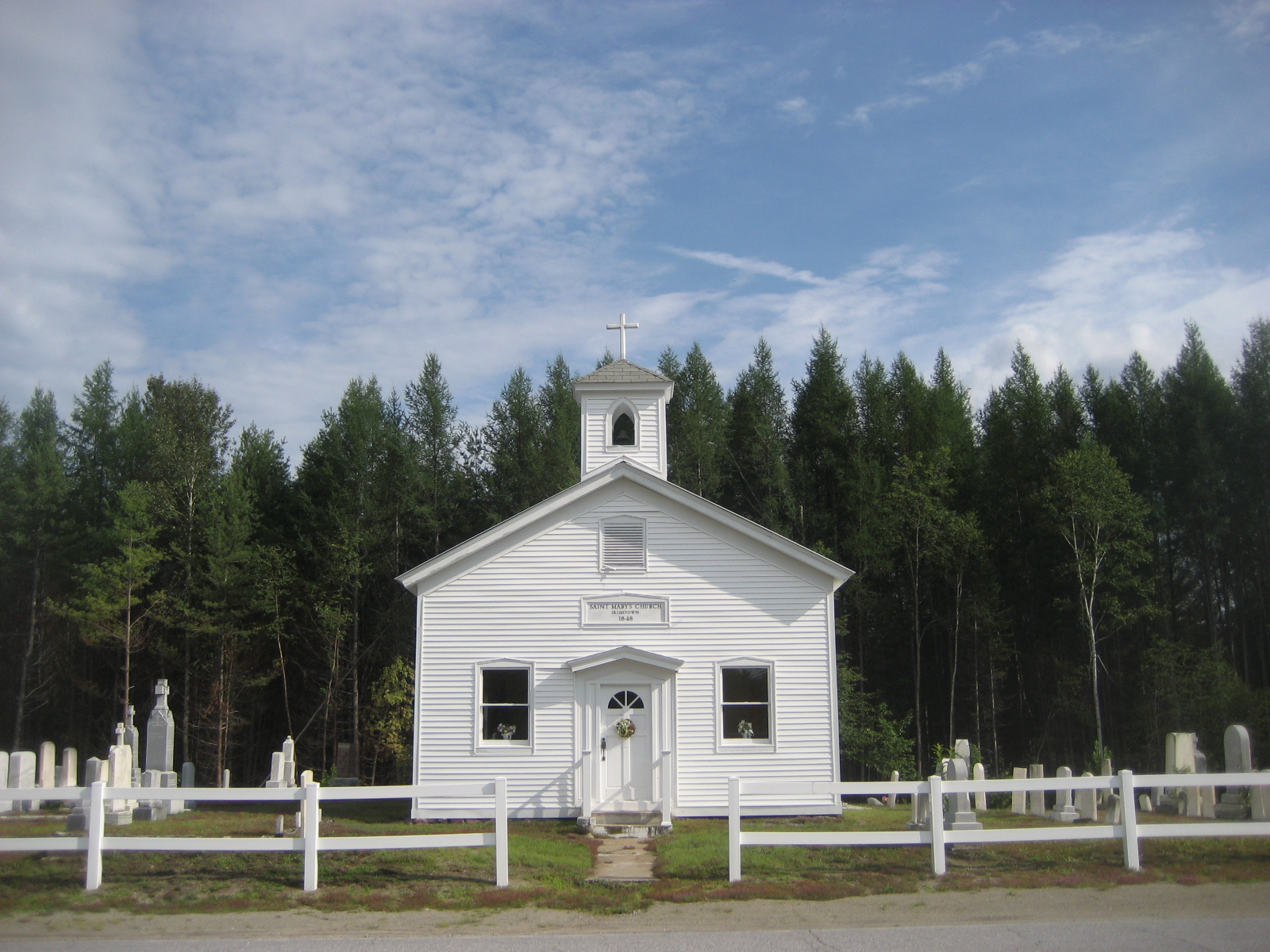
- St. Mary's Church at Irishtown, a hamlet in Minerva

- Location in Essex County and the state of New York
- Coordinates: 43°50′29″N 74°2′15″W
- Country: United States
- State: New York
- County: Essex

Government
  - Type: Town Council
  - Town Supervisor: Stephen R. McNally
  - Town Council: Members' List: • David LaBar (R); • Doug McCall; • Scott Fish; • Keith Dubay (R)

Area
  - Total: 160.27 sq mi (415.11 km^{2})
  - Land: 156.74 sq mi (405.96 km^{2})
  - Water: 3.53 sq mi (9.14 km^{2})
- Elevation: 1,499 ft (457 m)

Population (2020)
  - Total: 773
  - Density: 4.9/sq mi (1.9/km^{2})
- Time zone: UTC-5 (Eastern (EST))
  - Summer (DST): UTC-4 (EDT)
- ZIP Codes: 12851 (Minerva); 12857 (Olmstedville); 12852 (Newcomb); 12853 (North Creek)
- Area code: 518
- FIPS code: 36-031-47669
- GNIS feature ID: 0979224
- Website: townofminervany.gov

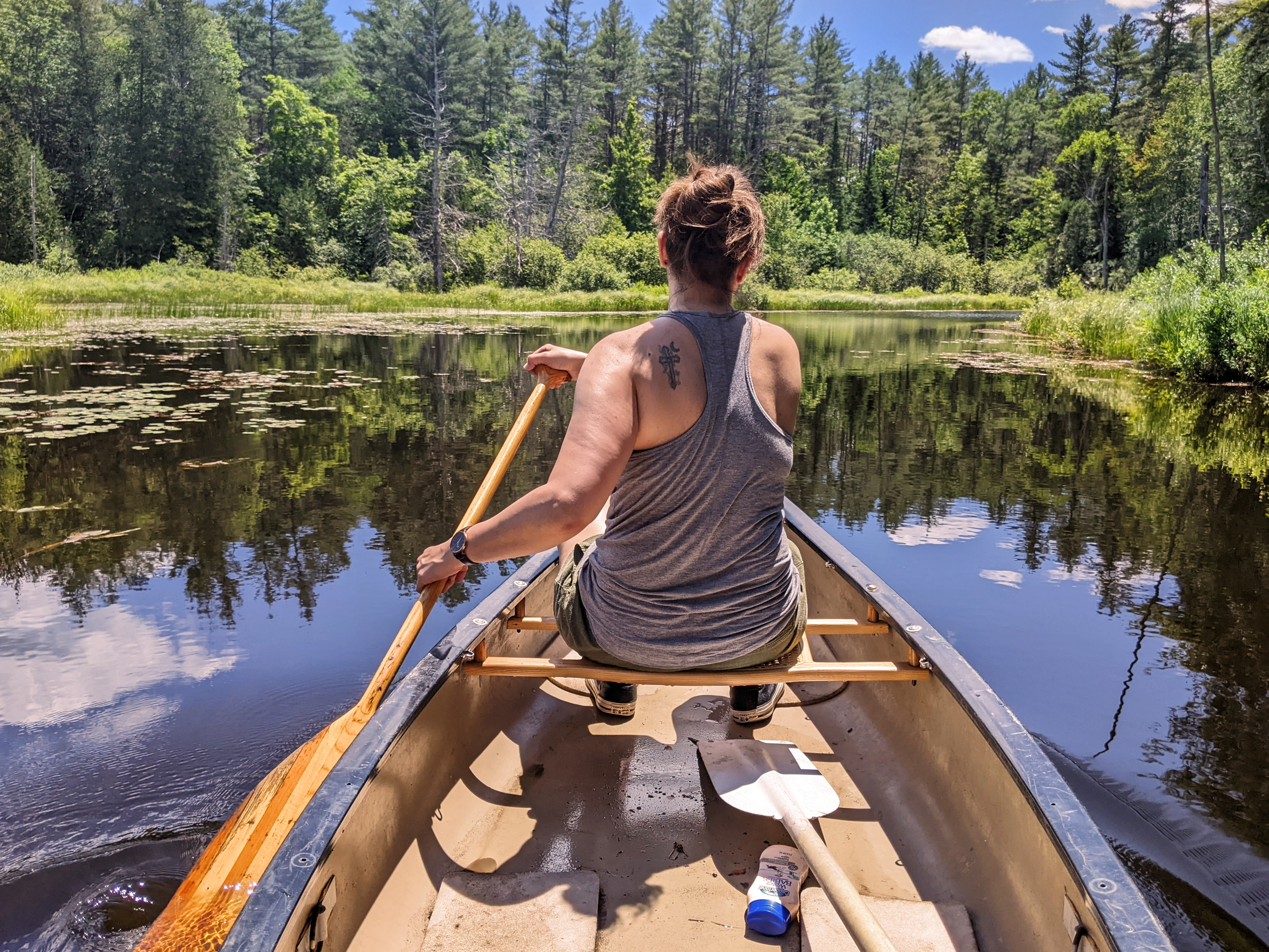
Canoeing on Minerva Stream

Minerva is a town in Essex County, New York, United States. The population was 773 at the 2020 census. The town is named after Minerva, the Roman goddess of wisdom. The town has a highly irregular polygonal shape. It is located in the southwestern corner of the county. By road, it is 40 miles (64 km) north-northwest of Queensbury, 85 miles (137 km) southwest of Burlington, Vermont, 88 miles (142 km) south of Plattsburgh, 93 miles (150 km) north of Albany, and 147 miles (237 km) south of Montreal, Quebec.

== History ==
The town was first settled around 1804 in the southeast part of Minerva, which has remained the center of the town's population. The town was formed from part of the Town of Schroon in 1817. Part of Minerva was part of the Town of Newcomb until 1828. In 1870, Minerva was increased with territory taken from the Town of Schroon.

== Geography ==
According to the United States Census Bureau, the town has a total area of 160.3 square miles (415.1 km^{2}), of which 156.8 square miles (406.0 km^{2}) is land and 3.5 square miles (9.1 km^{2}), or 2.2%, is water.

The northern part of the Hudson River forms part of the southwestern boundary of the town. The western town line is the border of Hamilton County, and the southern town line is the border of Warren County. The Indian River and Boreas River flow into the Hudson in the southwestern part of Minerva.

New York State Route 28N, the Roosevelt Marcy Memorial Highway, is a north–south highway which passes through Minerva and is the only road of significance in the town.

== Demographics ==
Historical population
Census	Pop.	Note	%±
1820	271		—
1830	358		32.1%
1840	455		27.1%
1850	586		28.8%
1860	903		54.1%
1870	908		0.6%
1880	1,162		28.0%
1890	979		−15.7%
1900	1,052		7.5%
1910	848		−19.4%
1920	610		−28.1%
1930	567		−7.0%
1940	505		−10.9%
1950	681		34.9%
1960	700		2.8%
1970	733		4.7%
1980	781		6.5%
1990	758		−2.9%
2000	796		5.0%
2010	809		1.6%
2020	773		−4.4%
U.S. Decennial Census

As of the census of 2000, there were 796 people, 321 households, and 225 families residing in the town. The population density was 5.0 inhabitants per square mile (1.9/km^{2}). There were 648 housing units at an average density of 4.1 per square mile (1.6/km^{2}). The racial makeup of the town was 96.86% White, 0.25% African American, 0.25% Native American, 0.13% Asian, and 2.51% from two or more races. Hispanic or Latino of any race were 0.13% of the population.

There were 321 households, out of which 27.7% had children under the age of 18 living with them, 57.0% were married couples living together, 8.4% had a female householder with no husband present, and 29.9% were non-families. 24.0% of all households were made up of individuals, and 10.3% had someone living alone who was 65 years of age or older. The average household size was 2.48 and the average family size was 2.95.

In the town, the population was spread out, with 23.1% under the age of 18, 5.8% from 18 to 24, 25.8% from 25 to 44, 27.1% from 45 to 64, and 18.2% who were 65 years of age or older. The median age was 42 years. For every 100 females, there were 110.6 males. For every 100 females age 18 and over, there were 111.8 males.

The median income for a household in the town was $30,903, and the median income for a family was $37,500. Males had a median income of $28,523 versus $19,688 for females. The per capita income for the town was $15,531. About 11.3% of families and 13.6% of the population were below the poverty line, including 16.4% of those under age 18 and 14.2% of those age 65 or over.

== Communities and locations in Minerva ==
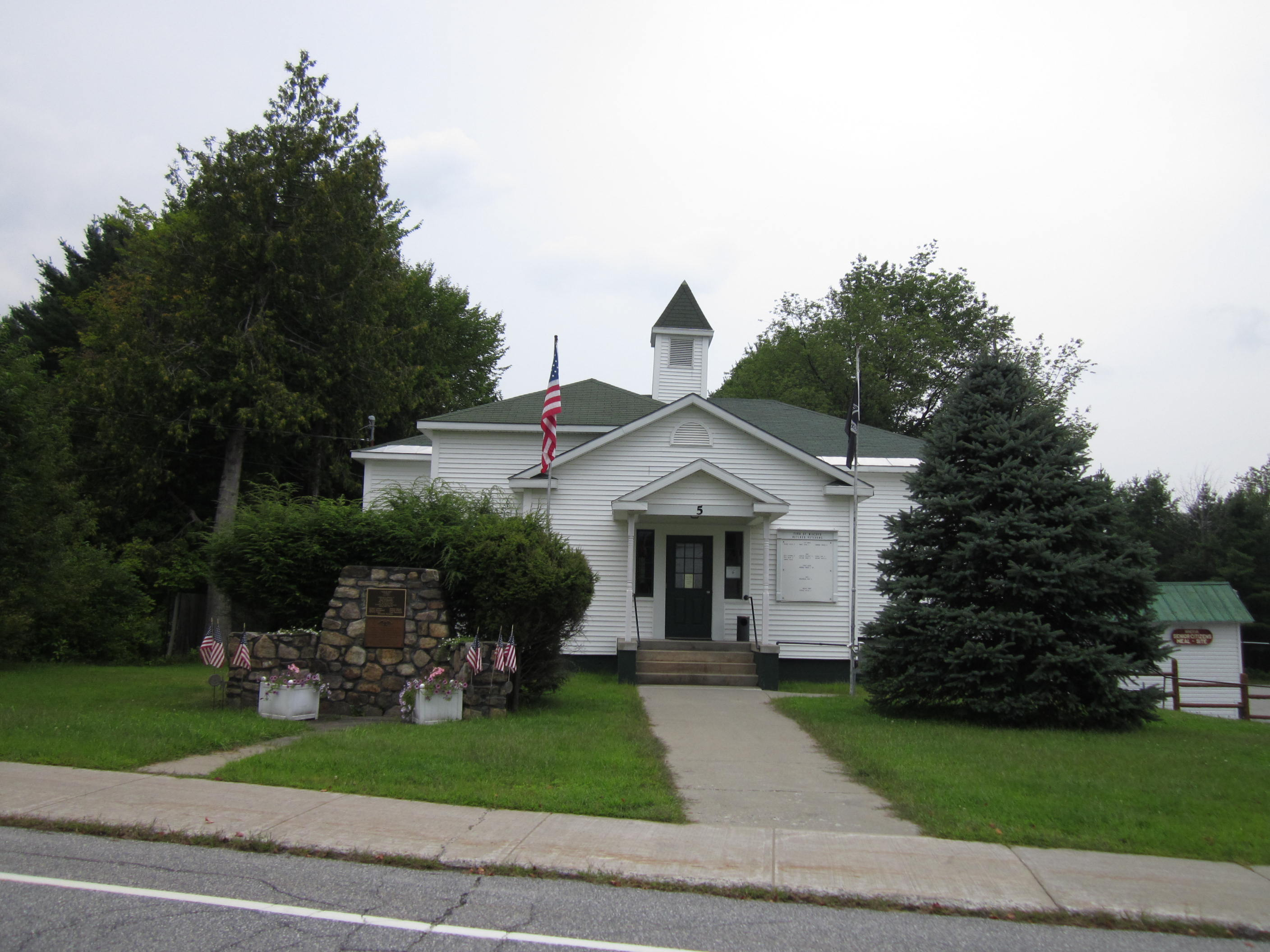
Minerva Town Hall

- Aiden Lair – A location near the northern town line on NY-28N.
- Lake Balfour – A lake south of Aiden Lair.
- Camps Baco and Che-Na-Wah – brother/sister camps located on Lake Balfour in the summer
- Boreas River – A hamlet in the northeastern corner of the town on Route 2.
- Chain Lakes – A number of connected lakes at the western town line.
- Hewitt Pond – A lake east of Alden Lair.
- Irishtown – A hamlet on County Road 24.
- Leonardsville – A hamlet due east of Minerva on the Trout Brook Rd.
- Loch Muller – A hamlet northeast of Minerva.
- Minerva – The hamlet of Minerva is in the southern part of the town on NY-28N. It is primarily a resort village for tourists.
- Minerva Lake – A small artificial lake east of Minerva village, formed circa 1932 by damming Jones Brook.
- Mink Lake – A small lake near the southern town line.
- Moose Pond – A small lake in the northwestern part of Minerva.
- Moose Pond Club – A hamlet in the northwestern part of the town.
- Morse Corners – A former community in Minerva, near Minerva village.
- Northwoods Club – A hamlet in the southwestern part of the town, by Mink Lake.
- Olmstedville – A hamlet southeast of Minerva village on County Road 29. Minerva Central School and station of Minerva Fire & Rescue are located there.
- Pudding Hollow – A hamlet northwest of Minerva village on NY-28N.
- Stillwater – A hamlet southeast of Moose Pond Club.

== Notable people ==
- Solomon Northup (1808 – c. 1863), a free-born African-American kidnapped and sold into slavery for 12 years before regaining his freedom, was born here and attended local schools. His book about his experiences was published in 1853, adapted in 1984 as a PBS movie directed by Gordon Parks, and again in 2013 as a feature-length film directed by Steve McQueen.
- Winslow Homer, nineteenth-century painter, was a summer visitor for several years.
- Grace Hudowalski, ninth person and first woman to climb all 46 of the Adirondack High Peaks, grew up in Minerva.
