= Newcomb, New York =

- Town
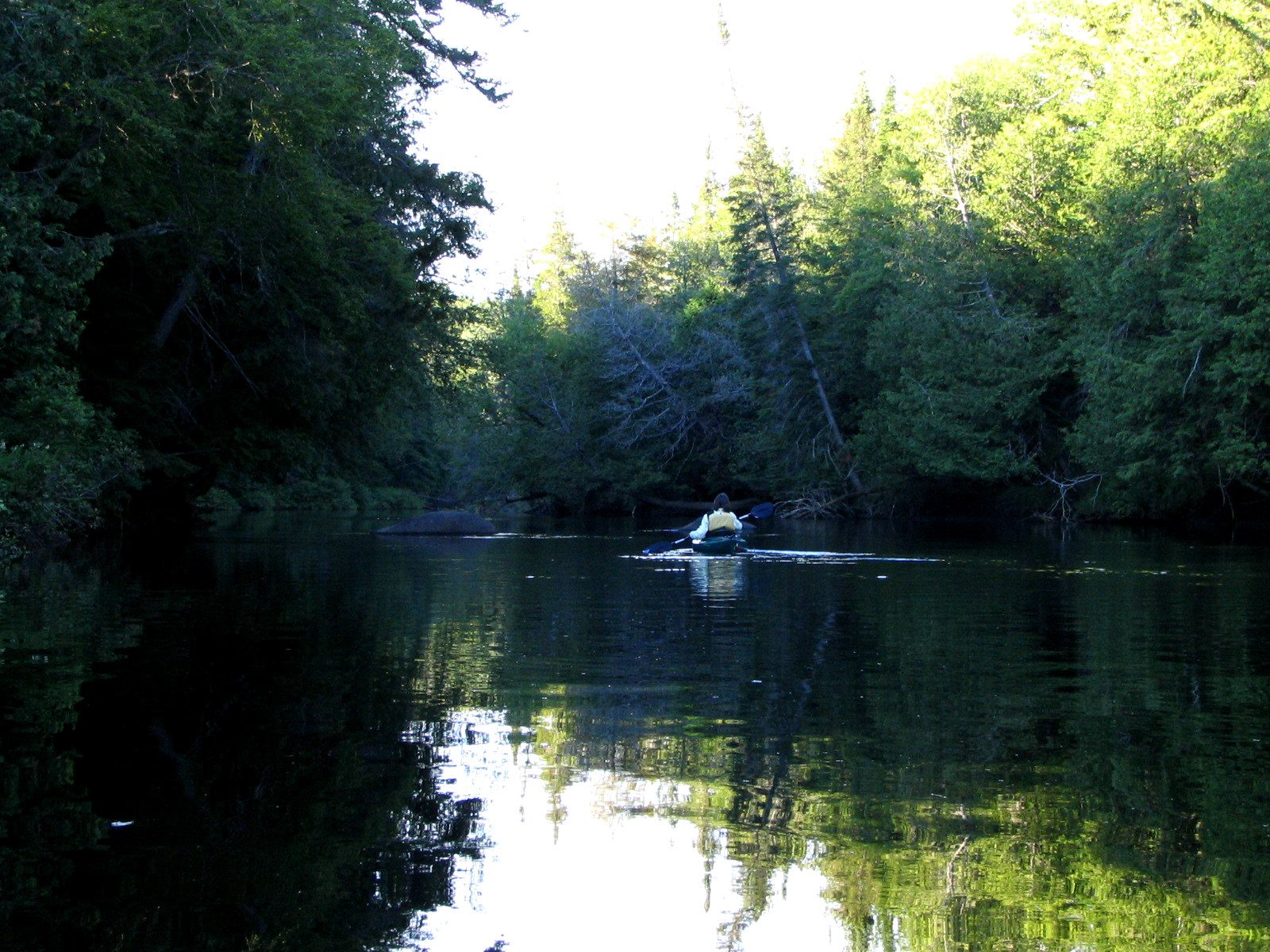
- The Hudson River in Newcomb, a few miles south of its source
- Motto: "Heart of the Park"
- Location in Essex County and the state of New York
- Coordinates: 43°58′17″N 74°9′39″W
- Country: United States
- State: New York
- County: Essex

Government
  - Type: Town Council
  - Town Supervisor: Robin DeLoria (R)
  - Town Council: Members' List: • Dave Olbert; • Paul LaCourse; • Lana Fennessy; • Donald Bott

Area
  - Total: 233.17 sq mi (603.90 km^{2})
  - Land: 226.19 sq mi (585.83 km^{2})
  - Water: 6.98 sq mi (18.07 km^{2})
- Elevation: 1,946 ft (593 m)

Population (2020)
  - Total: 418
  - Density: 1.8/sq mi (0.69/km^{2})
- Time zone: UTC−5 (Eastern (EST))
  - Summer (DST): UTC−4 (EDT)
- ZIP codes: 12852, 12879
- Area code: 518
- FIPS code: 36-031-50144
- GNIS feature ID: 0979261
- Website: newcombny.gov

Newcomb is a town in Essex County, New York, United States. The population was 436 at the 2010 census.

The town is on the western border of the county. It is 86 miles (138 km) by road southwest of Plattsburgh, 77 miles (124 km) southwest of Burlington, Vermont, 110 miles (180 km) northeast of Utica, 112 miles (180 km) north-northwest of Albany, and 146 miles (235 km) south-southwest of Montreal. The town is inside the Adirondack Park and contains the Lake Harris Campground. The town is the largest by area in Essex County.

== History ==
The town lies in an area historically claimed by both Iroquois and Algonquian tribes, and was on the frontier between colonial New York and New France.

The town was settled around 1816. Most of the early industry was devoted to harvesting lumber until the discovery of large iron ore deposits.

The town of Newcomb was established in 1828 from parts of the towns of Minerva and Moriah. It includes the hamlet of Newcomb, but does not contain an incorporated village.

By the end of the 19th century, the town was becoming famous as a sportsman's paradise.

Theodore Roosevelt was informed of the impending death of President William McKinley in September 1901 while hunting and hiking in the town.

Camp Santanoni, the Gooley Club and the Mount Adams Fire Observation Station, located atop Mount Adams, are listed on the National Register of Historic Places.

== Geography ==
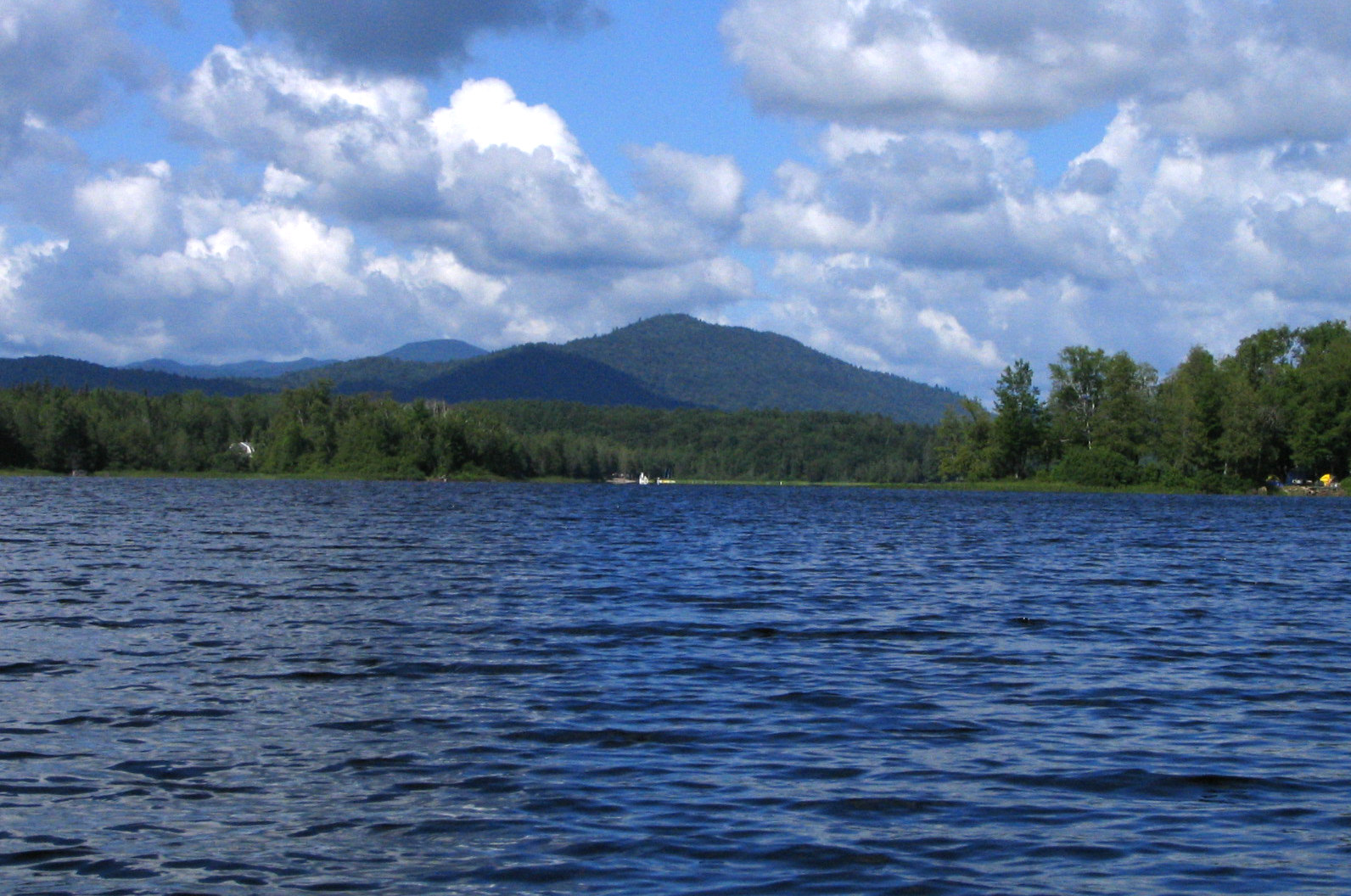
Lake Harris in Newcomb

According to the United States Census Bureau, the town has a total area of 233.2 square miles (603.9 km^{2}), of which 226.3 square miles (586.0 km^{2}) is land and 6.9 square miles (17.9 km^{2}), or 2.96%, is water. The Hudson River officially starts at Henderson Lake in the northeastern part of town and flows southward through the center of town.

The northern part of the western town line is the border of Hamilton County. The western section of the northern town boundary is the border of Franklin County.

New York State Route 28N, an east–west road, is a major highway in Newcomb.

=== Climate ===
Newcomb has a humid continental climate (Dfb) with warm summers coupled with cool nights and cold, snowy winters with seasonal snowfall averaging 104.9 inches (266 centimeters).

Climate data for Newcomb, New York, 1991–2020 normals, extremes 1940–present
Month	Jan	Feb	Mar	Apr	May	Jun	Jul	Aug	Sep	Oct	Nov	Dec	Year
Record high °F (°C)	60 (16)	62 (17)	78 (26)	88 (31)	91 (33)	95 (35)	94 (34)	94 (34)	91 (33)	85 (29)	74 (23)	62 (17)	95 (35)
Mean maximum °F (°C)	45.9 (7.7)	47.7 (8.7)	57.4 (14.1)	73.0 (22.8)	82.9 (28.3)	86.1 (30.1)	86.3 (30.2)	84.5 (29.2)	82.0 (27.8)	74.1 (23.4)	61.6 (16.4)	48.2 (9.0)	88.5 (31.4)
Mean daily maximum °F (°C)	25.6 (−3.6)	28.8 (−1.8)	37.3 (2.9)	50.2 (10.1)	64.3 (17.9)	72.4 (22.4)	76.6 (24.8)	74.5 (23.6)	67.4 (19.7)	54.4 (12.4)	41.4 (5.2)	30.6 (−0.8)	52.0 (11.1)
Daily mean °F (°C)	14.7 (−9.6)	16.5 (−8.6)	25.3 (−3.7)	38.6 (3.7)	51.8 (11.0)	60.5 (15.8)	64.8 (18.2)	63.0 (17.2)	55.9 (13.3)	44.1 (6.7)	32.6 (0.3)	21.5 (−5.8)	40.8 (4.9)
Mean daily minimum °F (°C)	3.7 (−15.7)	4.2 (−15.4)	13.2 (−10.4)	26.9 (−2.8)	39.2 (4.0)	48.7 (9.3)	53.0 (11.7)	51.6 (10.9)	44.3 (6.8)	33.7 (0.9)	23.8 (−4.6)	12.3 (−10.9)	29.6 (−1.3)
Mean minimum °F (°C)	−19.6 (−28.7)	−16.8 (−27.1)	−10.9 (−23.8)	13.2 (−10.4)	27.2 (−2.7)	35.9 (2.2)	43.7 (6.5)	41.2 (5.1)	31.4 (−0.3)	22.3 (−5.4)	6.6 (−14.1)	−10.2 (−23.4)	−23.5 (−30.8)
Record low °F (°C)	−36 (−38)	−40 (−40)	−31 (−35)	−3 (−19)	18 (−8)	25 (−4)	31 (−1)	29 (−2)	22 (−6)	10 (−12)	−19 (−28)	−31 (−35)	−40 (−40)
Average precipitation inches (mm)	3.33 (85)	2.73 (69)	3.09 (78)	3.55 (90)	4.24 (108)	4.35 (110)	4.20 (107)	4.23 (107)	3.70 (94)	4.50 (114)	3.74 (95)	3.83 (97)	45.49 (1,154)
Average snowfall inches (cm)	23.9 (61)	23.4 (59)	19.6 (50)	4.6 (12)	0.2 (0.51)	0.0 (0.0)	0.0 (0.0)	0.0 (0.0)	0.0 (0.0)	0.8 (2.0)	8.6 (22)	23.8 (60)	104.9 (266.51)
Average extreme snow depth inches (cm)	17.9 (45)	23.3 (59)	23.4 (59)	11.5 (29)	0.2 (0.51)	0.0 (0.0)	0.0 (0.0)	0.0 (0.0)	0.0 (0.0)	0.6 (1.5)	4.7 (12)	12.0 (30)	26.5 (67)
Average precipitation days (≥ 0.01 in)	17.2	13.1	12.4	12.7	13.4	13.0	12.8	11.8	11.2	13.7	13.7	16.3	161.3
Average snowy days (≥ 0.1 in)	15.1	11.4	8.6	3.5	0.2	0.0	0.0	0.0	0.0	0.8	5.5	13.0	58.1
Source 1: NOAA
Source 2: National Weather Service

== Demographics ==
Historical population
Census	Pop.	Note	%±
1830	62		—
1840	74		19.4%
1850	277		274.3%
1860	157		−43.3%
1870	178		13.4%
1880	237		33.1%
1890	283		19.4%
1900	507		79.2%
1910	509		0.4%
1920	313		−38.5%
1930	437		39.6%
1940	460		5.3%
1950	1,212		163.5%
1960	1,187		−2.1%
1970	957		−19.4%
1980	681		−28.8%
1990	544		−20.1%
2000	481		−11.6%
2010	436		−9.4%
2020	418		−4.1%
U.S. Decennial Census

As of the census of 2000, there were 481 people, 211 households, and 140 families residing in the town. The population density was 2.1 inhabitants per square mile (0.81/km^{2}). There were 655 housing units at an average density of 2.9 per square mile (1.1/km^{2}). The racial makeup of the town was 95.22% White, 0.62% Native American, 0.62% from other races, and 3.53% from two or more races. Hispanic or Latino of any race were 0.42% of the population.

There were 211 households, out of which 19.9% had children under the age of 18 living with them, 60.2% were married couples living together, 4.3% had a female householder with no husband present, and 33.2% were non-families. 30.3% of all households were made up of individuals, and 16.1% had someone living alone who was 65 years of age or older. The average household size was 2.26 and the average family size was 2.81.

In the town, the population was spread out, with 19.5% under the age of 18, 3.7% from 18 to 24, 18.9% from 25 to 44, 31.0% from 45 to 64, and 26.8% who were 65 years of age or older. The median age was 51 years. For every 100 females, there were 96.3 males. For every 100 females age 18 and over, there were 93.5 males.

The median income for a household in the town was $32,639, and the median income for a family was $41,875. Males had a median income of $35,750 versus $28,750 for females. The per capita income for the town was $17,043. About 5.8% of families and 9.1% of the population were below the poverty line, including 19.5% of those under age 18 and 3.5% of those age 65 or over.

== Communities and locations in Newcomb ==
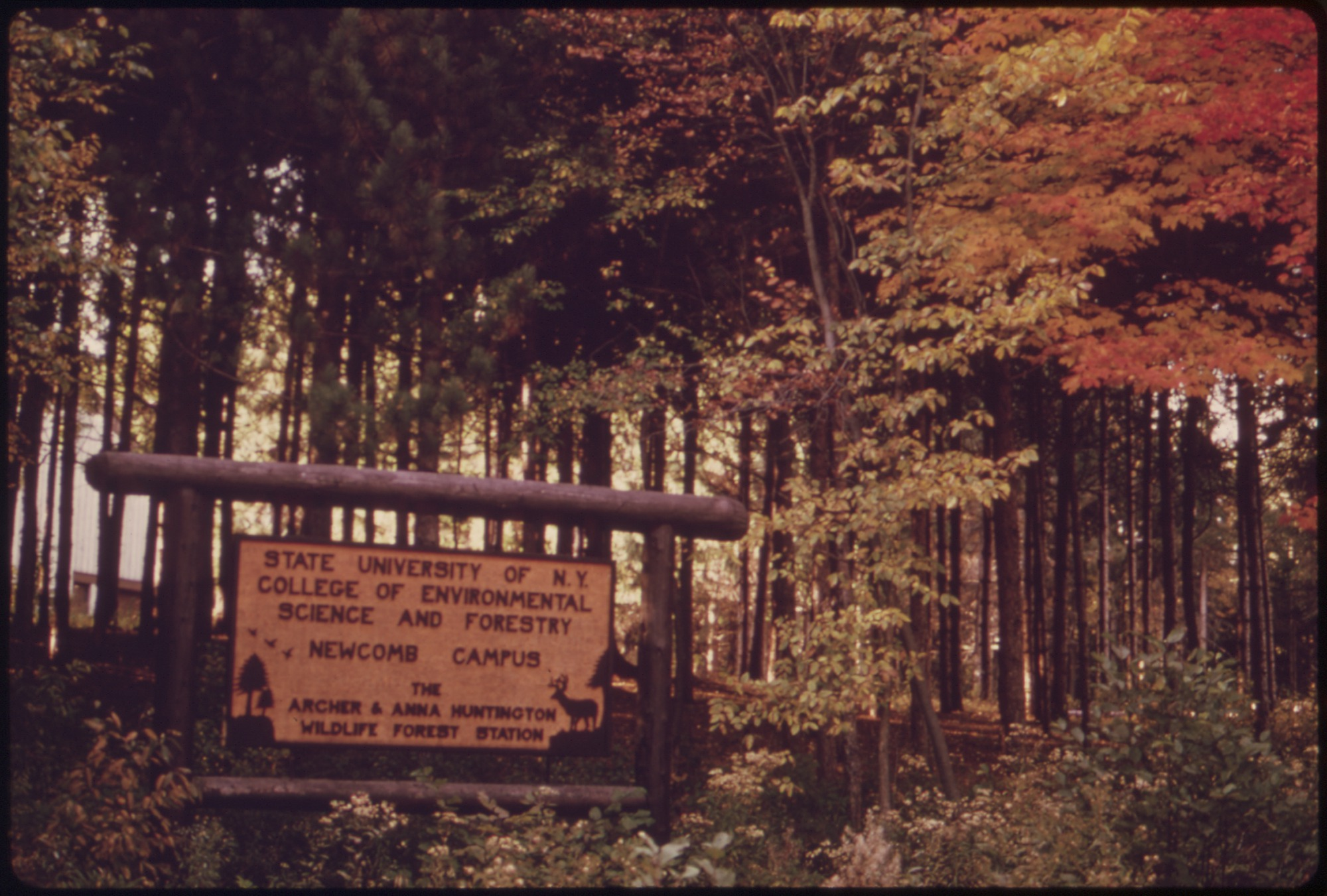
SUNY-ESF Newcomb Campus

- Adirondack Interpretive Center (AIC) – A visitor center that provides environmental education and helps orient visitors to the park.
- Camp Santanoni – One of the "Great Camps" of the 19th century, currently under restoration. Also known as Santanoni Preserve. On Newcomb Lake.
- Catlin Lake – A lake partly in the town at the western town line.
- Goodnow Flow – An artificial lake southwest of Newcomb hamlet.
- Lake Harris – A lake northeast of Newcomb hamlet.
- Henderson Lake – A lake north of Tahawus, source and start of the Hudson River.
- Hudson River Gorge – A valley cut by the Hudson River, south of Newcomb hamlet.
- Moose Pond – A lake near the western town boundary.
- Newcomb – The hamlet of Newcomb is situated on NY-28N.
- Newcomb Lake – A lake in the western part of the town.
- Perch Pond – A lake east of Tahawus Club.
- Rich Lake – A lake northwest of Newcomb hamlet.
- Sanford Lake – A lake located on the Hudson River at Tahawus, a couple miles south of Henderson Lake.
- Tahawus – A location on County Road 25 in the northern part of the town. This was the site of a major mining and iron smelting operation in the 19th century. It is now a ghost town. Tahawus is also the accepted aboriginal name for Mount Marcy, the highest peak in New York, located outside the town to the east.
- Tahawus Club – A location east of Newcomb.
- Trout Pond – A lake east of Tahawus Club.
- Wolf Pond – A lake near the western town line.
