= Santanoni Preserve =

- Camp Santanoni
- U.S. National Register of Historic Places
- U.S. National Historic Landmark
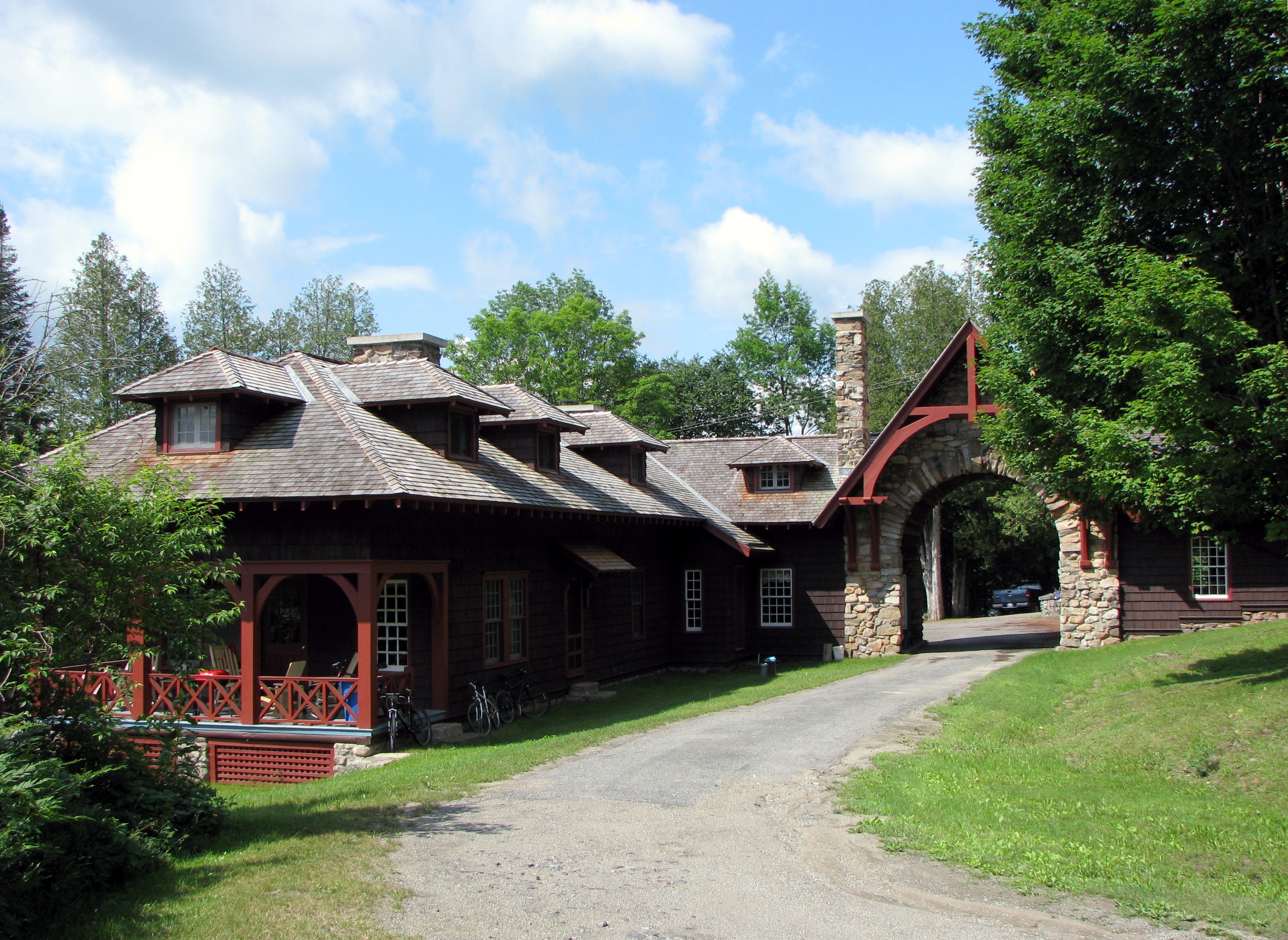

- Location within New York
- Location: Newcomb Lake
- Nearest city: Newcomb, New York
- Coordinates: 44°0′41″N 74°7′44″W
- Area: 12,990 acres (52.6 km^{2})
- Architects: Robertson, Robert H.; Delano & Aldrich
- MPS: Great Camps of the Adirondacks TR
- NRHP reference No.: 86002955

Significant dates
- Added to NRHP: April 03, 1987
- Designated NHL: May 16, 2000

The Santanoni Preserve was once a private estate of approximately 13,000 acres (53 km^{2}) in the Adirondack Mountains, and now is the property of the State of New York, at Newcomb, New York.

== History ==
Santanoni Preserve was established by Robert C. Pruyn (1847–1934), a prominent Albany banker and businessman. Acquiring about 12,900 acres (52.2 km^{2}) in the Town of Newcomb, just south of the Adirondack High Peaks, Pruyn employed the distinguished architect Robert H. Robertson (1849–1914) to design a summer residential complex. Robert C. Pruyn's heirs in 1953 sold the Santanoni Preserve to the Melvin family, leaders in the business and professional community of Syracuse, New York.

The Melvin family continued to enjoy the camp for almost twenty more years, although maintaining it on a simpler scale. In 1971, one of the Melvins' grandchildren, eight-year-old Douglas Legg, disappeared in the forest at Santanoni and was never seen again. The family, not caring to return to the scene of this tragedy, quickly contracted with the newly formed Adirondack Conservancy Committee of The Nature Conservancy to purchase the entire Santanoni Preserve. The furnishings were removed, and the Conservancy then resold the property to the state of New York for incorporation into the State Forest Preserve.

For two decades Camp Santanoni buildings were inadequately maintained by the state, since the intent, as required by the Article Fourteen of the New York State Constitution (providing for retention of Adirondack wilderness) was to remove improvements in order to return the Santanoni Preserve to a "forever wild' condition. In 2000, it was formally classified as a Historic Area; this land classification allows for the maintenance of historic resources for public enjoyment and understanding.

== Camp Santanoni ==
A residential complex of about forty-five buildings within the Santanoni Preserve, Camp Santanoni was one of the earliest examples of the "Great Camps of the Adirondacks". The complex now is known as the Camp Santanoni Historic Area and is a National Historic Landmark. At the time of completion, Camp Santanoni was regarded as the grandest of all such Adirondack camps.

Camp Santanoni has three main groupings of buildings:The Gate Lodge complex; the farm complex; and the Main Camp. The Robert H. Robertson buildings for the Main Camp were built in 1892–93. The farm buildings were designed around 1902 by Edward Burnett, the leading farm designer of the time. The Gate Lodge was designed in 1905 by William Adams Delano of the New York City architectural firm of Delano and Aldrich.

The Gate Lodge complex is situated at the edge of the hamlet of Newcomb, included an impressive gate Lodge with a monumental, stone, gateway arch and six staff bedrooms, a caretakers home, and assorted barns, wagon sheds and other buildings.

The farm complex, a mile farther into the estate, included a massive set of barns, three farmhouses and workers' cottages, a stone creamery, workshop, chicken house, kennels, smoke house, root cellar and other service buildings. With imported and domestic breeds of cattle, sheep, goats, pigs and poultry, Santanoni had probably the largest farm operation ever associated with a family estate in the Adirondacks. It supplied the camp with its meat and produce, while surplus dairy products were sold in Newcomb and sent to Albany for the Pruyns and their friends. Many Newcomb residents today still own milk bottles with "Santanoni" embossed on them in raised letters.

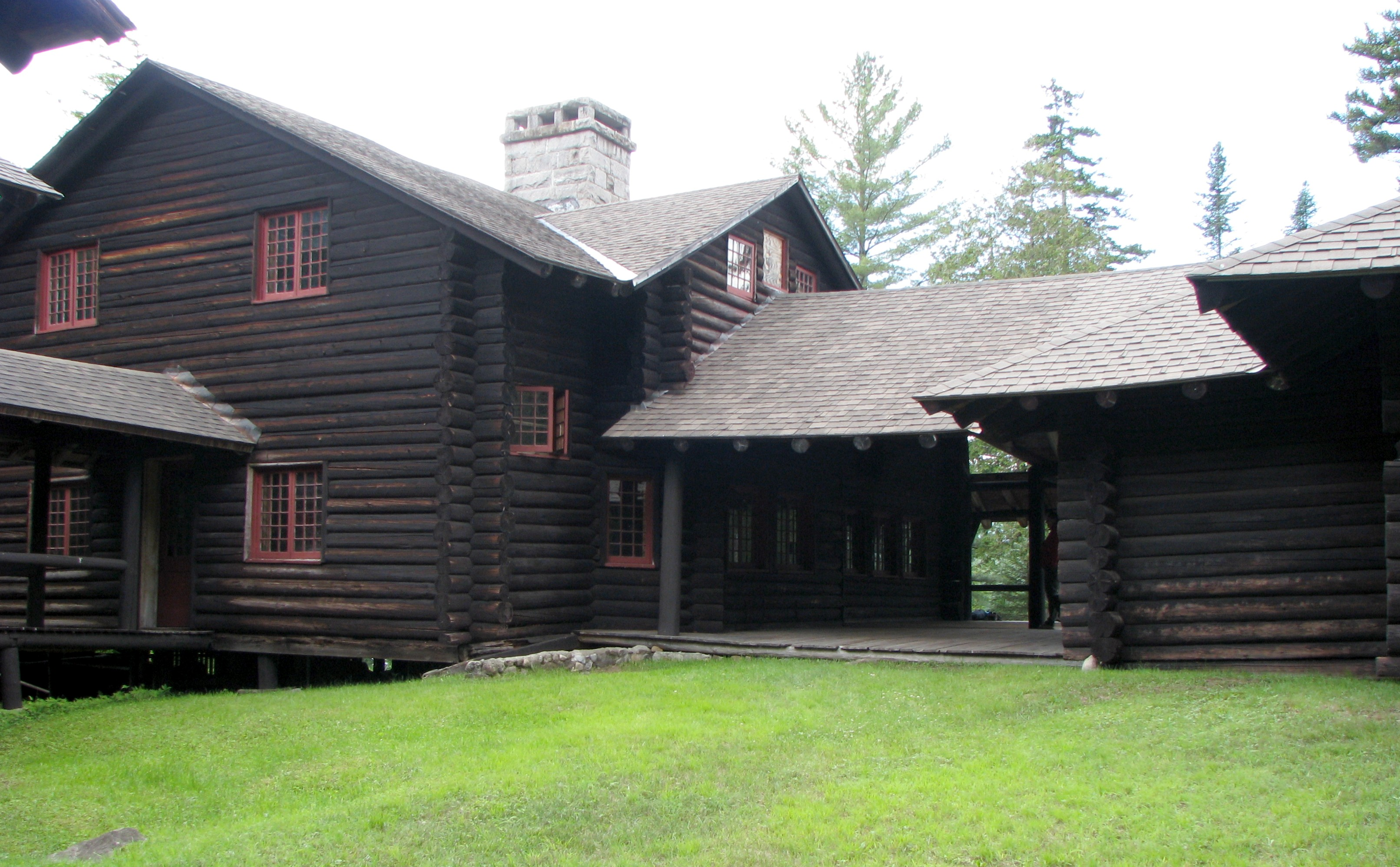
Camp Santanoni main lodge, for Robert C. Pruyn (1892-93)

The Main Camp was situated 4.7 miles (7.6 km) from the Gate Lodge complex, farther into the estate on the shore of Newcomb Lake, with a view toward the Adirondack High Peaks. The central lodge was a grouping of six separate buildings—the main living and dining lodge with two bedrooms upstairs; four sleeping cabins with a total of seven bedrooms; and a kitchen and service building with seven staff bedrooms— all connected by a common roof and porch system. 1500 spruce trees were used in the log construction. With its log grill work on the eaves, birch-bark wall covering and hand-hewn beams in the two-story high ceiling of the main living area, half-log decorative patterns on many walls and doors, fieldstone fireplaces, and other structural and decorative features, Santanoni is an example of rustic Adirondack Architecture and the craft of log construction.

Flanking the central lodge on the lake shore were a boathouse and an artist's studio, built for Pruyn's artistic son, Edward Lansing Pruyn. In the woods behind the main lodge were another caretaker's home, workshop, ice house, and assorted service buildings. A little farther away, on the road from the farm, were two more staff domiciles and another horse and carriage barn.

=== Design ===
Authors of a book (below) about the Santanoni Preserve have noted an influence of Japanese architecture evident in Robertson's design. Most apparent of these is a single roof and continuous porch that connects five of the six buildings. The dominant roof is stepped in the Japanese fashion and resembles a bird-in-flight, the symbolic phoenix, when seen from the air. The authors observe that owner Robert C. Pruyn had served as secretary to his father, Robert H. Pruyn, when the latter was appointed by President Lincoln in 1861 as minister to Japan. He was the second such ambassador since Commodore Perry's voyage had opened trade with this hitherto unknown realm. The Pruyns were well-connected in the business, political, and social life of the Empire State. Among many other involvements, Robert C. Pruyn was aide to Governor Dix, President of National Commercial Bank (now Key Bank), and a Regent of the University of the State of New York. Theodore Roosevelt and James Fenimore Cooper, Jr. were among the many distinguished visitors who regularly visited the Pruyns at their Adirondack camp.

== Preservation ==
After two years' efforts of a regional preservation organization, Adirondack Architectural Heritage, the state agreed in principle to retain most of the historic buildings of the Santanoni Preserve. Since 1993, the New York State Department of Environmental Conservation, Adirondack Architectural Heritage and the Town of Newcomb have restored structures, assisted by grants for conservation and restoration from the federal Save America's Treasures program, grants from the New York State Environmental Protection Fund, and other allocations from New York State. Funds from the Getty Foundation Grant Program assisted development of the Conservation Plan, which has guided all recent work.

Santanoni Preserve was included in a multiple property submission for listing on the National Register of Historic Places in 1986 and was listed there in 1987. It was declared a National Historic Landmark in 2000.

== Access ==
Santanoni Preserve is open year-round. In summer, visitors can walk, bike, horseback ride, or ride a horse-drawn wagon down the historic road; in winter, they can cross-country ski or snowshoe. Many of the building interiors, especially at the main camp, are open seasonally. From July 4 through Labor Day, interpretive staff provide free tours at camp at 11 am, 1 pm and 3 pm daily.

The Santanoni Preserve is located on Newcomb Lake, north of the hamlet of Newcomb.

== Gallery ==
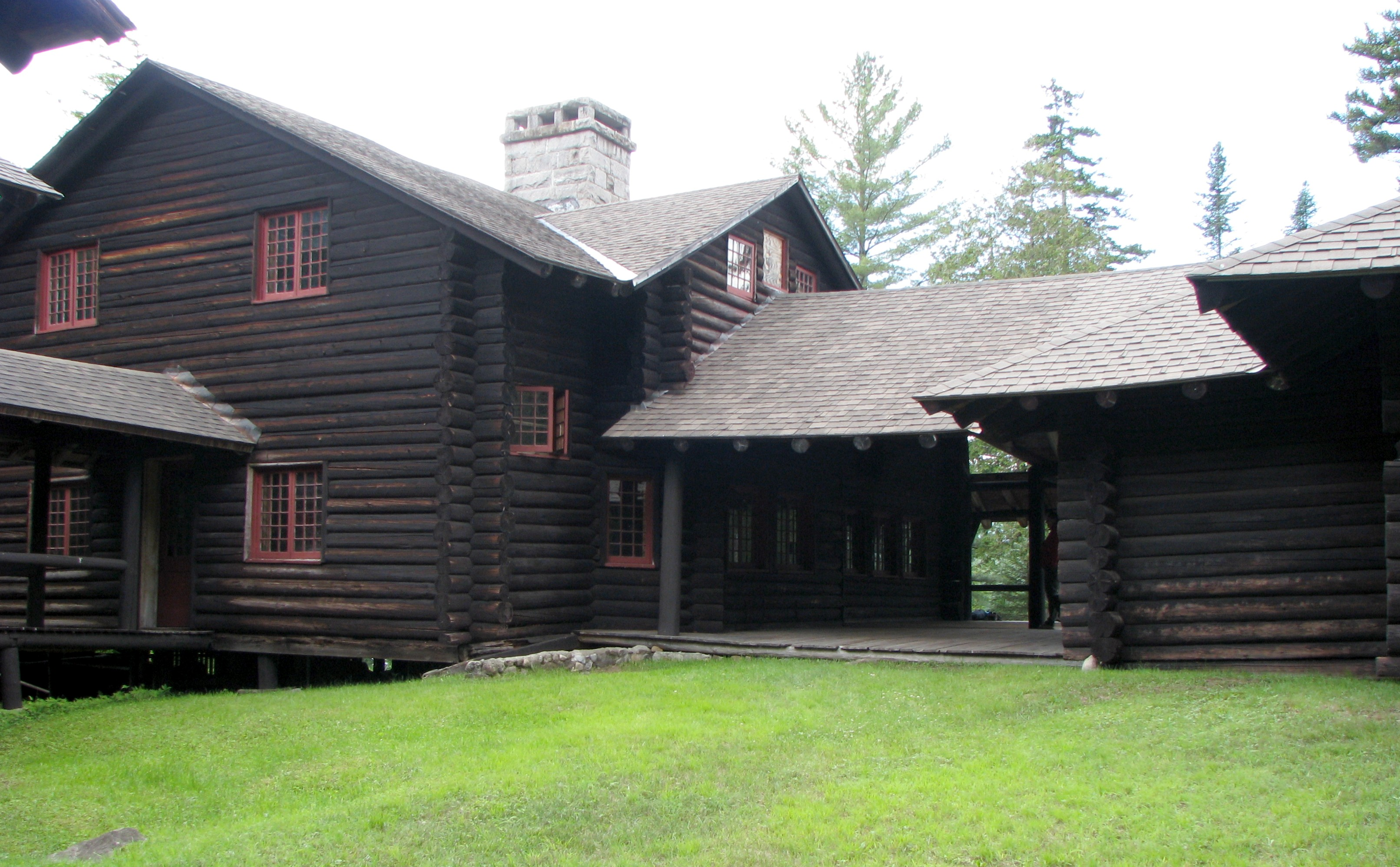
Main lodge

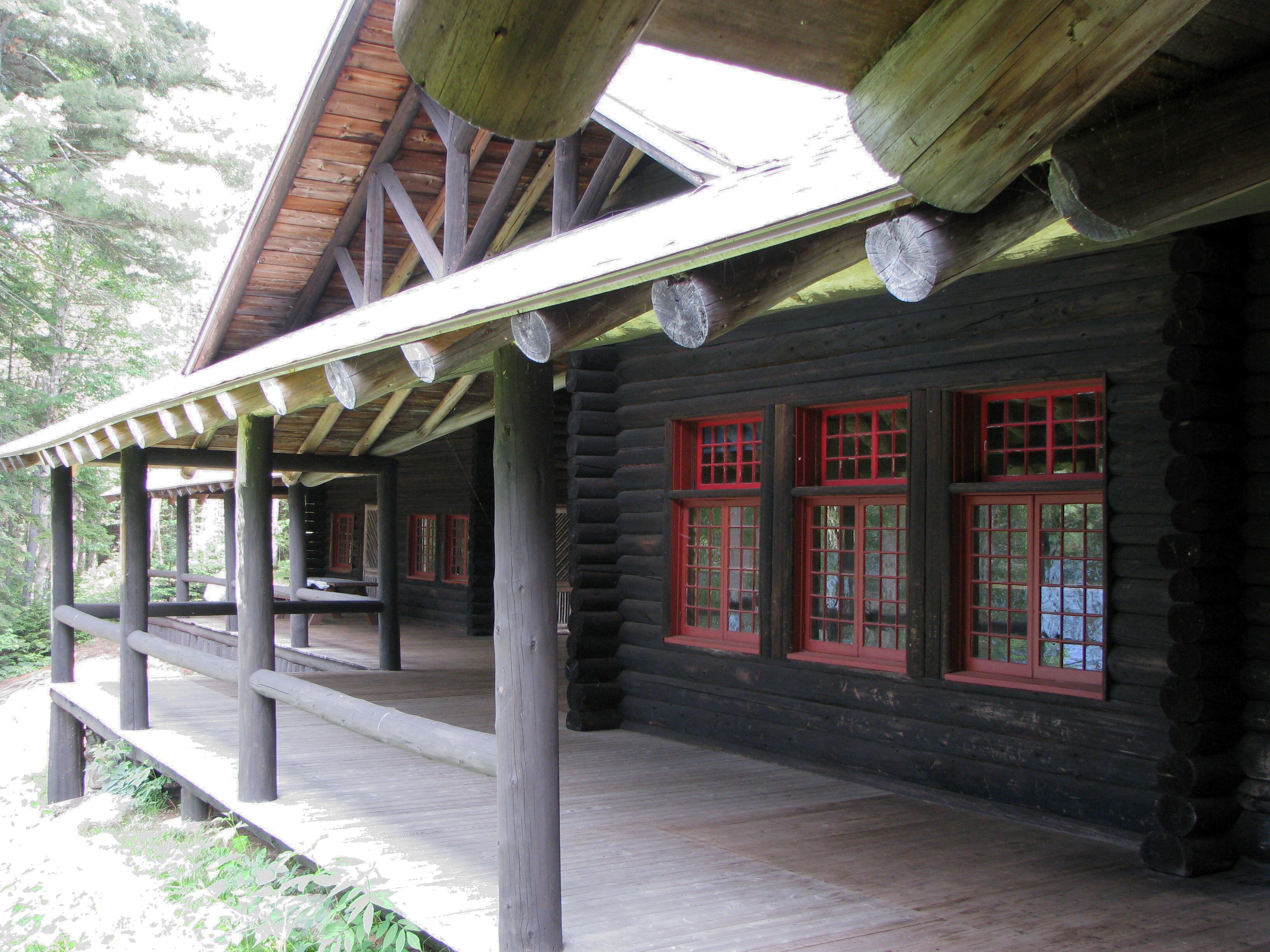
Part of the extensive system of porches

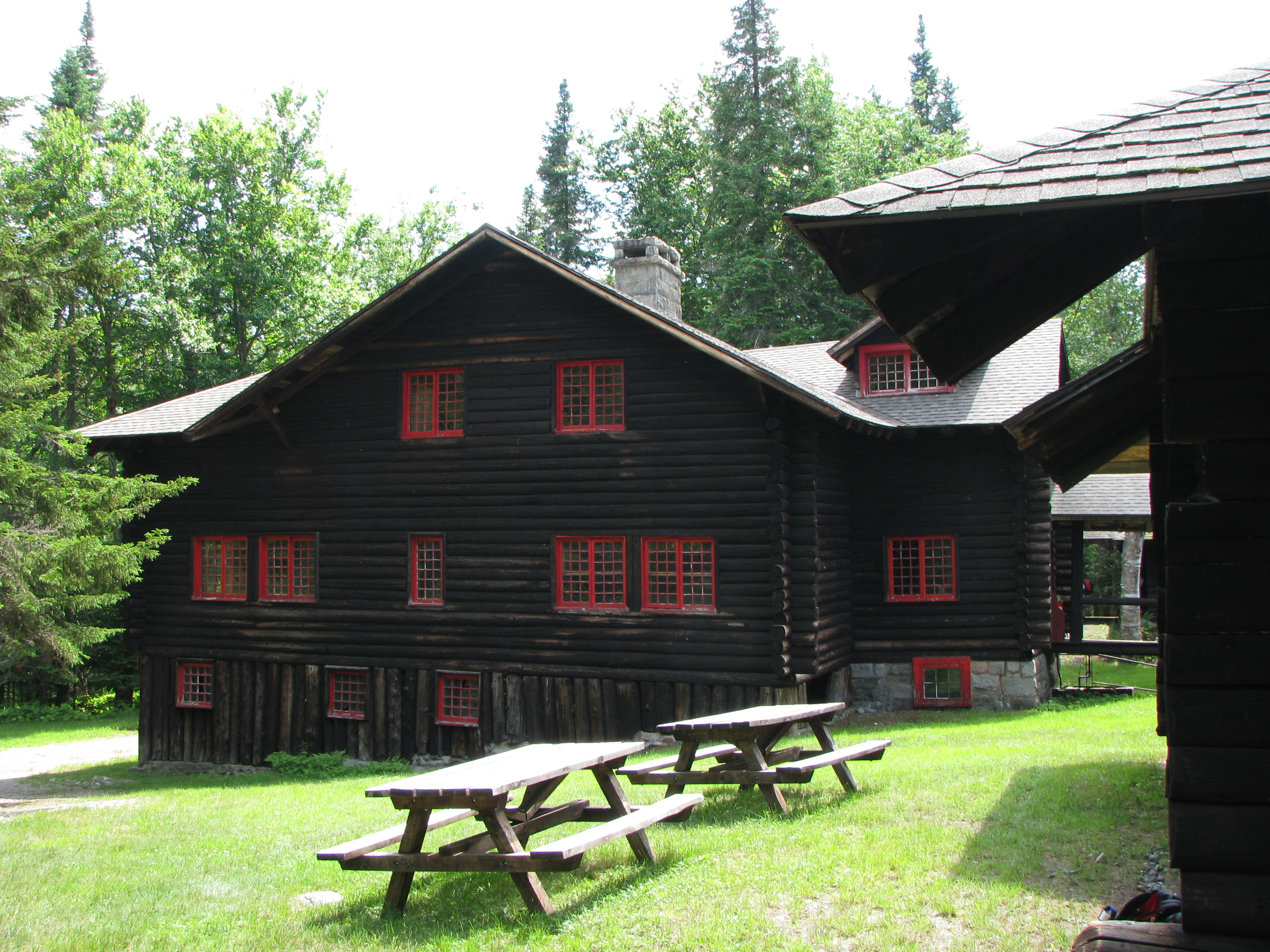
Kitchen block

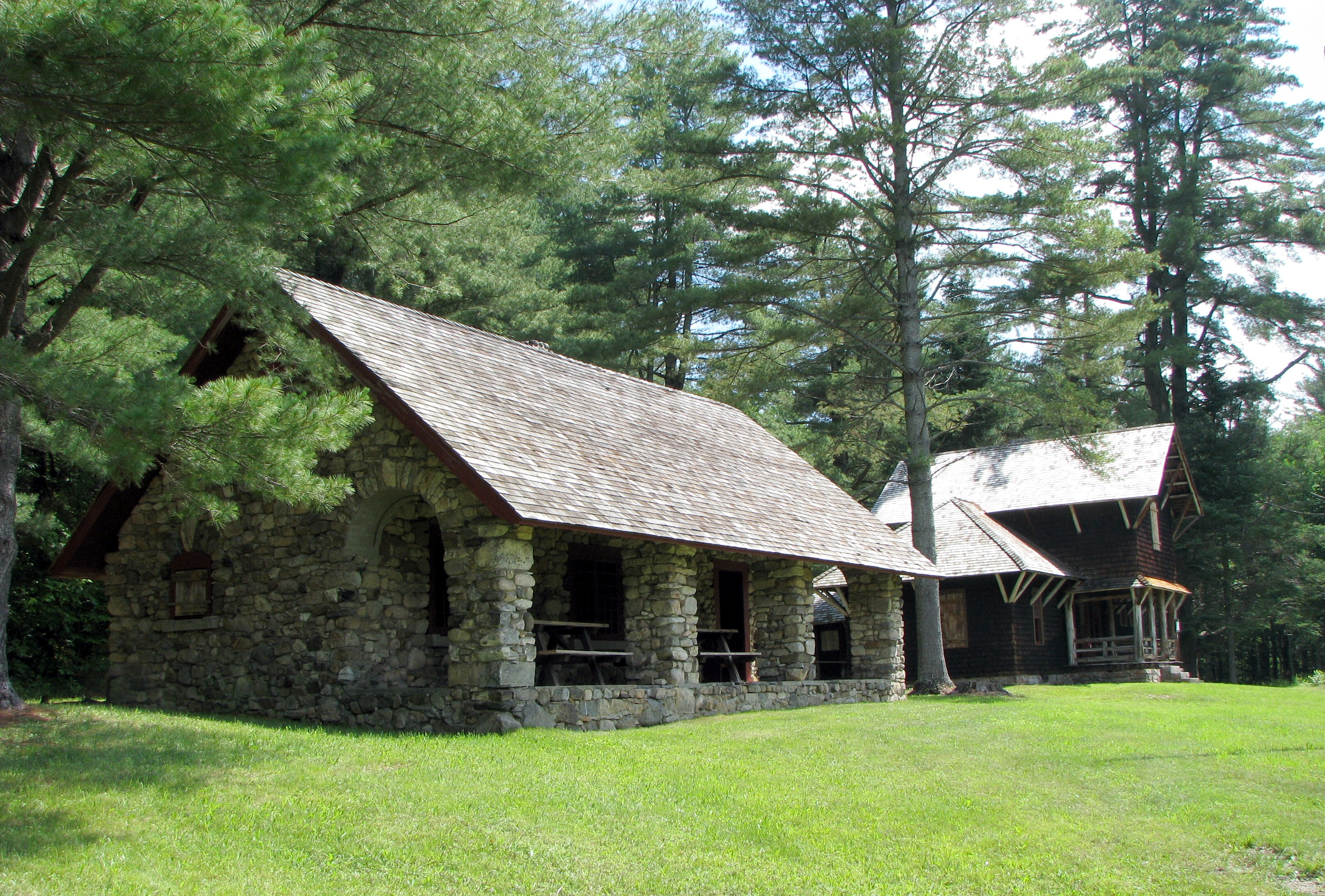
Creamery (left), Gardener's Cottage (right)

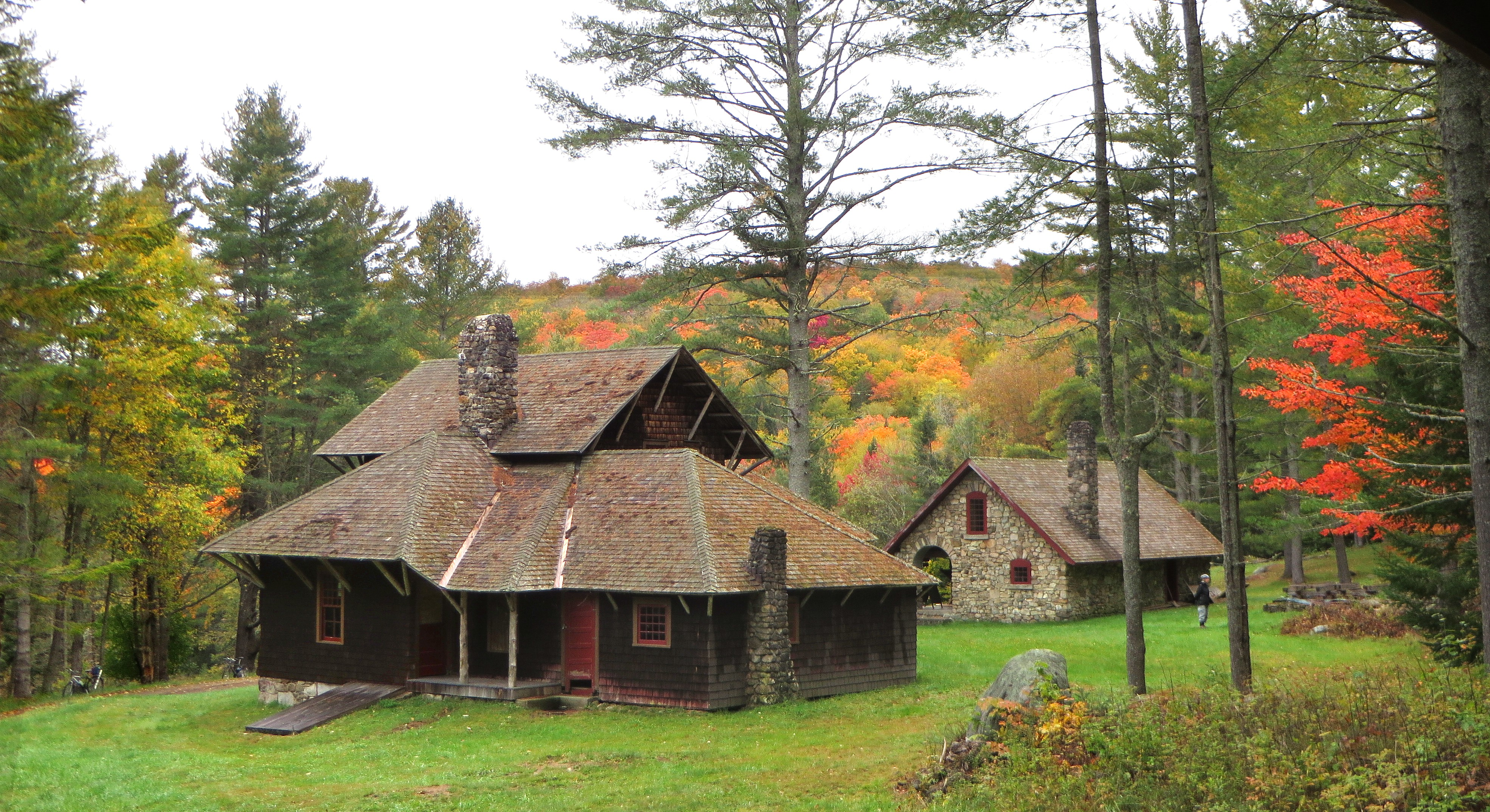
Back of the Gardener's Cottage (left) and Creamery (right)

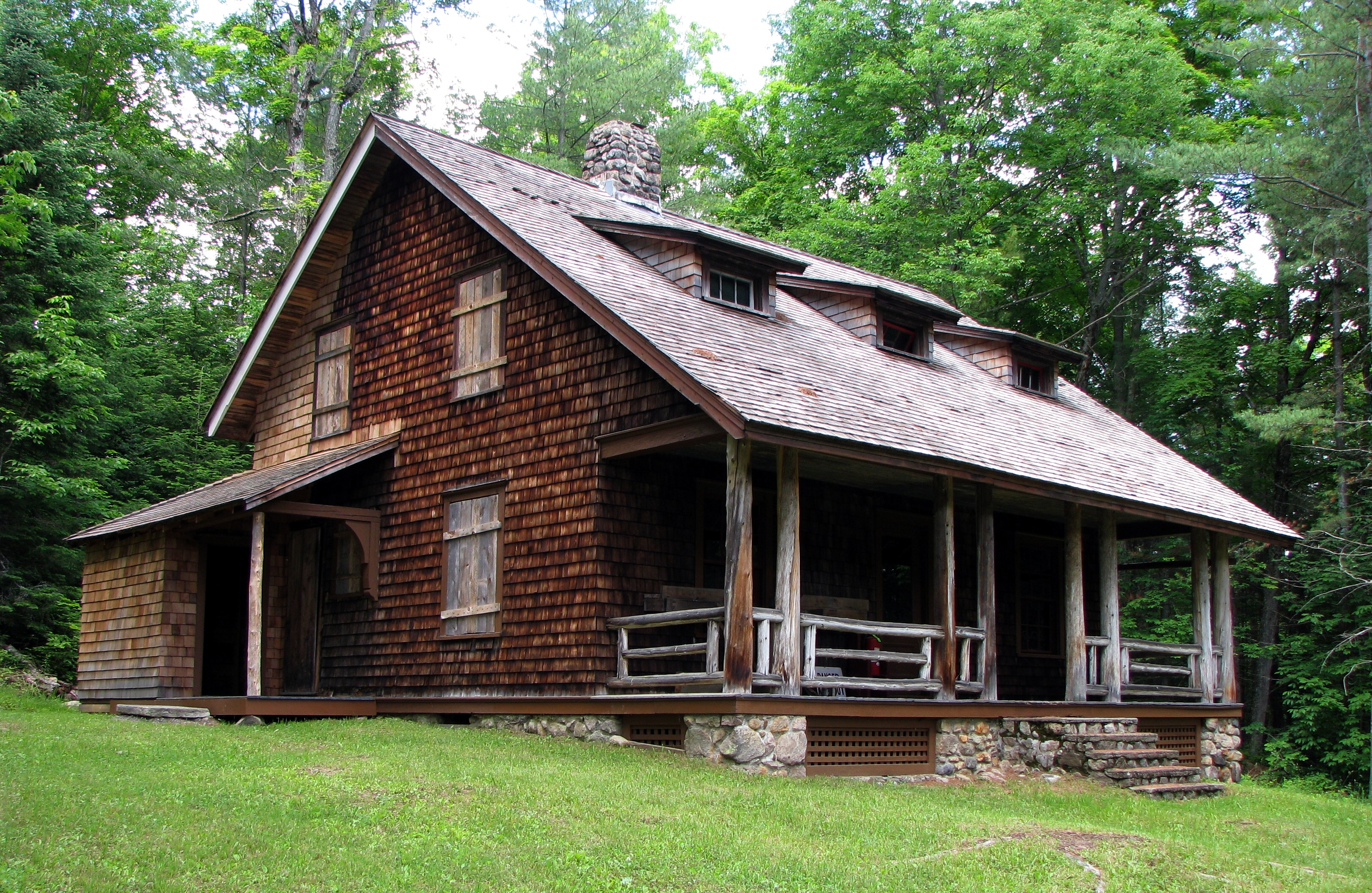
Herdsman's cottage
