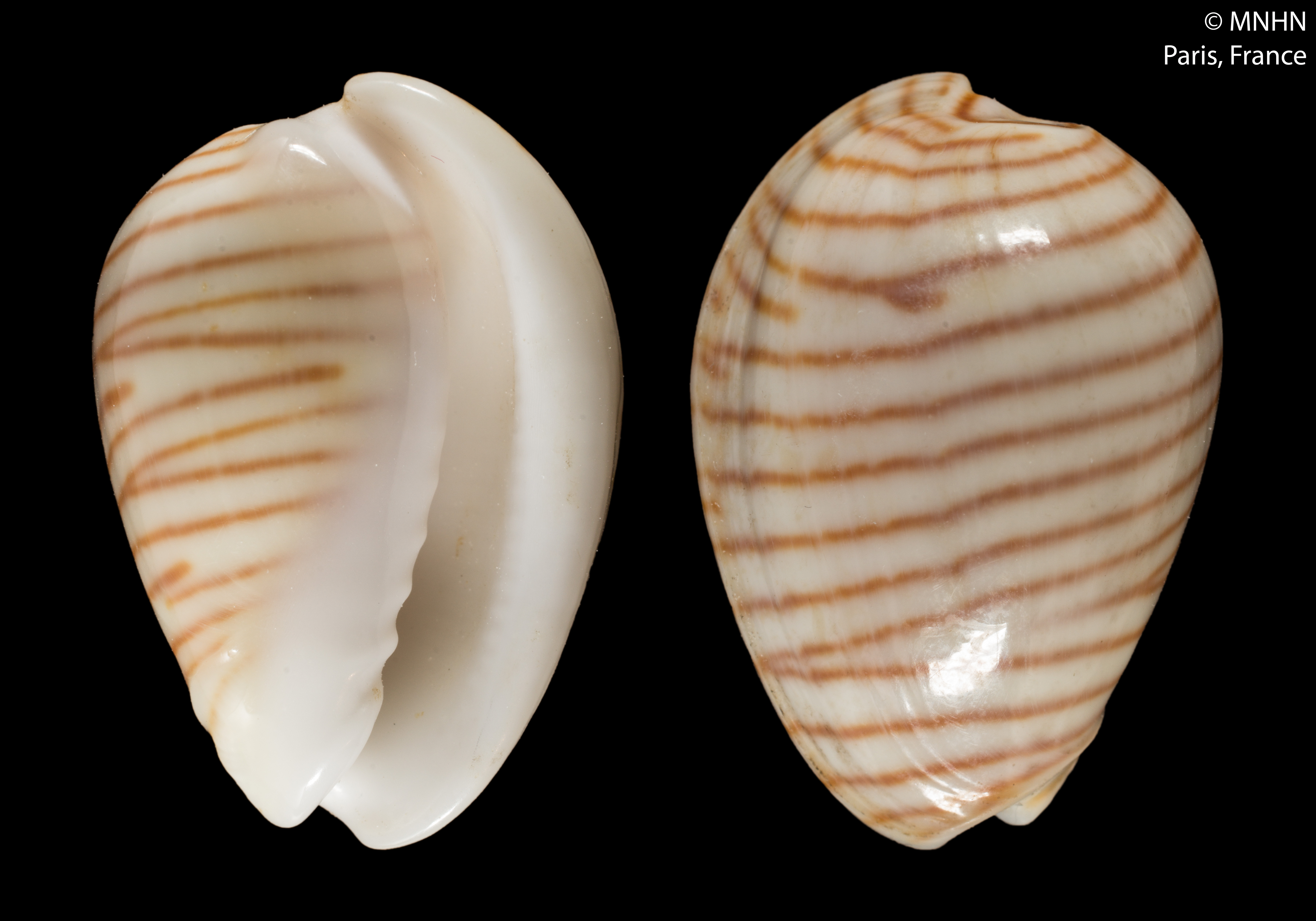
- shell of Persicula cingulata

Scientific classification
- Kingdom: Animalia
- Phylum: Mollusca
- Class: Gastropoda
- Subclass: Caenogastropoda
- Order: Neogastropoda
- Family: Cystiscidae
- Subfamily: Persiculinae
- Genus: Persicula; Schumacher, 1817

Type species
- Persicula variabilis Schumacher, 1817

Synonyms
- Marginella (Persicula) Schumacher, 1817; Persicula (Rabicea) Gray, 1857

= Persicula =

Genus of gastropods

Persicula is a taxonomic genus of minute to small predatory sea snails, marine gastropod mollusks. It includes several species which are micromollusks.

This genus is placed in the family Cystiscidae. It was previously in the family Marginellidae the margin snails. Both families are within the order Neogastropoda.

(Note: Gastropod taxonomy has been in flux for more than half a century, and this is especially true currently, because of new research in molecular phylogeny. Because of all the ongoing changes, different reliable sources can yield very different classifications.)

== Habitat ==
Species in this genus live from the intertidal zone to 370 meters in depth.

== Shell description ==
In this genus the shell is minute to small. It can be uniformly colored or white, and the color can be patterned. The shell is moderately thick to thick. The spire is usually immersed. The lip of the aperture is thickened, and weakly to strongly lirate.

An external varix can be present or absent. There is a distinct siphonal notch present and a posterior notch is also present. The columella is multiplicate, with 4 to 13 plications plus parietal lirae.

== Description of soft parts ==
The animal has long tentacles, and the siphon is also usually long. The mantle appears not to extend completely over the external shell surface.

== Species ==
The separation between the genera Persicula and Gibberula is not well-defined. It is based on morphological differences with the larger species (showing a complex color pattern) belonging to Persicula, while the smaller species (showing a banded or uniform color pattern) belong to Gibberula. Many species with characteristics that fall between the two extremes, are ambiguous. Up to now (2010) there is no phylogenetic analysis to substantiate this rather arbitrary classification.

According to the World Register of Marine Species (WoRMS), the following species with valid names are included within the genus Persicula :

- Persicula accola B. Roth & Coan, 1968
- Persicula albomaculata (May, 1911)
- Persicula bagne Faber, 2006
- Persicula bahamasensis Petuch, 2002
- Persicula bandera Coan & Roth, 1965
- Persicula blanda Hinds, 1844
- Persicula brinkae Bozzetti, 1993
- Persicula calculus (Redfield, 1870)
- Persicula canaryensis (Clover, 1972)
- Persicula chrysomelina (Redfield, 1848)
- Persicula cingulata (Dillwyn, 1817)
- Persicula cordorae Jong & Coomans, 1988
- Persicula cornea (Lamarck, 1822)
- Persicula danilai Bozzetti, 1992
- Persicula deburghi A. Adams, 1864
- Persicula denansiana Ancey, 1881
- Persicula enolae Le Béon, 2014
- Persicula frumentum (Sowerby I, 1832)
- Persicula hennequini Boyer, Neefs & Wickfield, 1998
- Persicula hilli Smith, 1950
- Persicula imbricata Hinds, 1844
- Persicula ingridmariae T. Cossignani & Lorenz, 2019
- Persicula interruptolineata (Megerle von Mühlfeld, 1816)
- Persicula janae T. Cossignani & Lorenz, 2019
- Persicula maculosa (Kiener, 1834)
- Persicula maldiviana Cossignani, 2001
- Persicula margotae Le Béon, 2015
- Persicula masirana Roth & Petit, 1972
- Persicula moretzsohni Coltro, 2020
- Persicula multilineata Sowerby II, 1846
- Persicula muralis Hinds, 1844
- Persicula passamontii T. Cossignani & Lorenz, 2019
- Persicula persicula (Linnaeus, 1758)
- Persicula phrygia Sowerby III, 1846
- Persicula porcellana Gmelin, 1791
- Persicula pulcherrima Gaskoin, 1849
- Persicula quemeneri Cossignani, 2001
- Persicula rashafuni Bozzetti, 1993
- Persicula robusta Sowerby III, 1904
- Persicula sagittata Hinds, 1844
- Persicula shepstonensis Smith, 1906
- Persicula tessellata (Lamarck, 1822)
- Persicula testai Bozzetti, 1993
- Persicula vanpeli Moolenbeek & van der Bijl, 2008
- Persicula weberi Olsson & McGinty, 1958

Taxa inquirenda

- Persicula adamsiana Pilsbry & Love, 1932
- Persicula bulbulina Locard, 1897
- Persicula crossei Vélain, 1877
- Persicula glandina Vélain, 1877
- Persicula polyodonta Vélain, 1877

== Synonyms ==
- Persicula alborubida Barnard, 1969: synonym of Cystiscus pseustes (E. A. Smith, 1904)
- Persicula aldridgei Nowell-Usticke, 1969: synonym of Gibberula aldridgei (Nowell-Usticke, 1969) (original combination)
- Persicula cassidiforme Gaskoin, 1853 : synonym of Pachybathron cassidiforme (Gaskoin, 1853)
- Persicula catenata Montagu, 1803 : synonym of Gibberula catenata (Montagu, 1803)
- Persicula chudeaui Bavay: synonym of Gibberula chudeaui (Bavay in Dautzenberg, 1910)
- Persicula cypraeoides Adams, 1845 : synonym of Pachybathron cypraeoides (Adams, C.B., 1845)
- Persicula dalli Morretes, 1941: synonym of Archierato dalli (Morretes, 1941) (original combination)
- Persicula dentiformis Thiele, 1930: synonym of Gibberula dentiformis (Thiele, 1930)
- Persicula fluctuata Adams, 1850 : synonym of Gibberula fluctuata (Adams, 1850)
- Persicula grisea Jousseaume, 1875: synonym of Cryptospira grisea (Jousseaume, 1875) (original combination)
- Persicula kienerianum Petit, 1838 : synonym of Pachybathron kieneriana (Petit de la Saussaye, S., 1838)
- Persicula lucens Locard, 1897: synonym of Persicula blanda (Hinds, 1844)
- Persicula lucida (Marrat, 1877): synonym of Hyalina lucida (Marrat, 1877)
- Persicula maculata Swainson, 1840: synonym of Persicula persicula (Linnaeus, 1758)
- Persicula maldiviana T. Cossignani, 2001: synonym of Gibberula maldiviana (T. Cossignani, 2001) (original combination)
- Persicula miliaria (Linnaeus, 1758): synonym of Gibberula miliaria (Linnaeus, 1758)
- Persicula nigrocrocea Barnard, 1969: synonym of Plesiocystiscus aphanospira (Tomlin, 1913)
- Persicula obesa (Redfield, 1846): synonym of Persicula tessellata (Lamarck, 1822)
- Persicula persiculocingulata Tournier, 1997 : synonym of Persicula persicula (Linnaeus, C., 1758)
- Persicula pisiformis Thiele, 1930: synonym of Cystiscus cymbalum (Tate, 1878) (junior synonym)
- Persicula pulchella (Kiener, 1834): synonym of Gibberula pulchella (Kiener, 1834)
- Persicula saharica Locard, 1897: synonym of Persicula blanda (Hinds, 1844)
- Persicula tantilla Gould, 1860: synonym of Granulina tantilla (Gould, 1860) (original combination)
- Persicula tayrona Diaz & Velasquez, 1987: synonym of Pachybathron tayrona Díaz, J.M. & Velasquez, 1987
- Persicula thomensis (Tomlin, 1919): synonym of Gibberula thomensis (Tomlin, 1919)
- Persicula variabilis Schumacher, 1817: synonym of Persicula persicula (Linnaeus, 1758)
