= Persicula cordorae =

Scientific classification
- Kingdom: Animalia
- Phylum: Mollusca
- Class: Gastropoda
- Subclass: Caenogastropoda
- Order: Neogastropoda
- Family: Cystiscidae
- Subfamily: Persiculinae
- Genus: Persicula
- Species: P. cordorae

Binomial name
- Persicula cordorae De Jong & Coomans, 1988

Species of gastropod

Persicula cordorae is a species of sea snail, a marine gastropod mollusk, in the family Cystiscidae.
