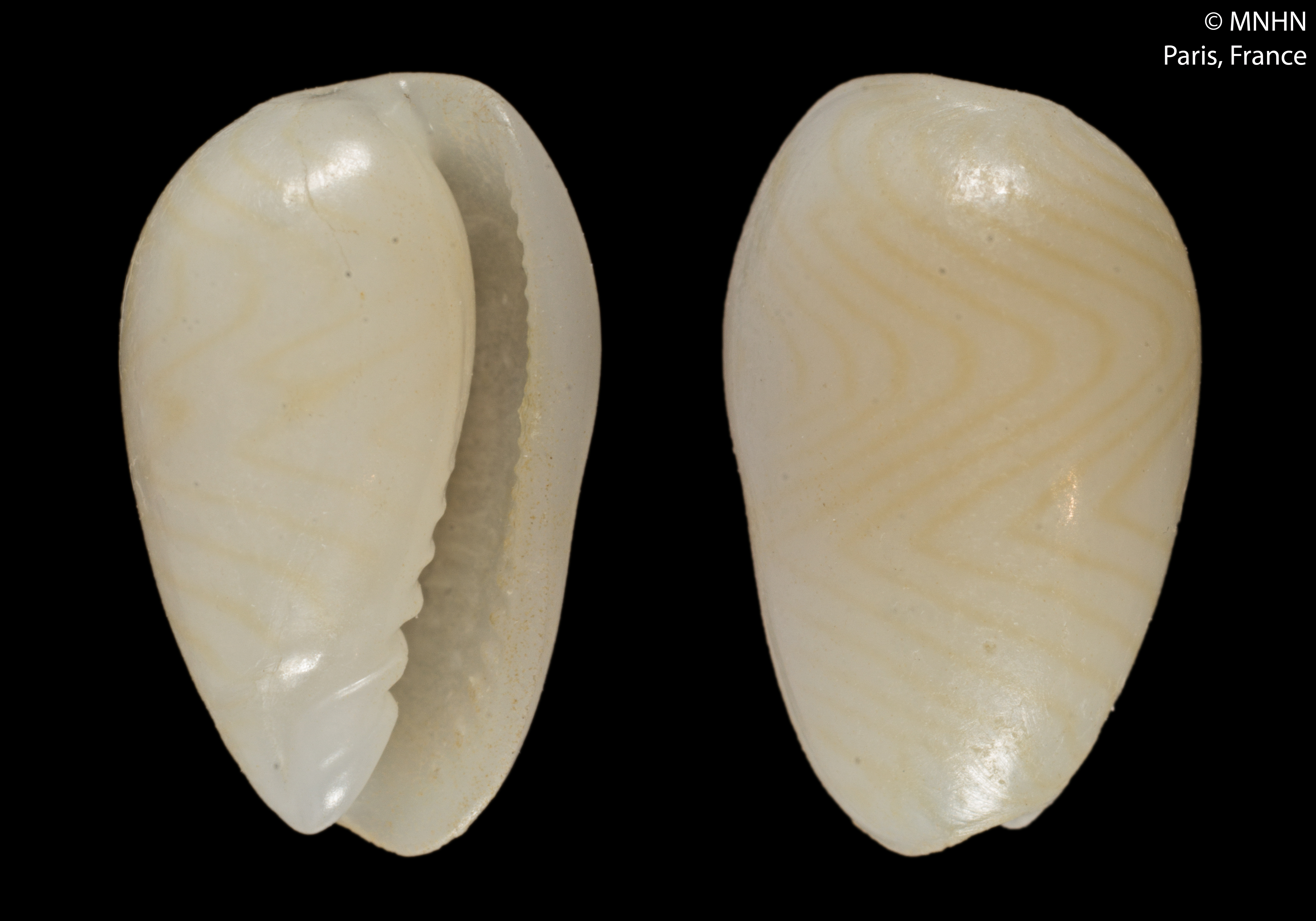
- Shell of Persicula margotae (holotype at MNHN, Paris)

Scientific classification
- Kingdom: Animalia
- Phylum: Mollusca
- Class: Gastropoda
- Subclass: Caenogastropoda
- Order: Neogastropoda
- Family: Cystiscidae
- Subfamily: Persiculinae
- Genus: Persicula
- Species: P. margotae

Binomial name
- Persicula margotae Le Béon, 2015

= Persicula margotae =

Species of gastropod

Persicula margotae is a species of sea snail, a marine gastropod mollusk, in the family Cystiscidae.

== Description ==
The length of the shell attains 8.1 mm.

== Distribution ==
This species is endemic to the Saudi Arabian part of the Red Sea.
