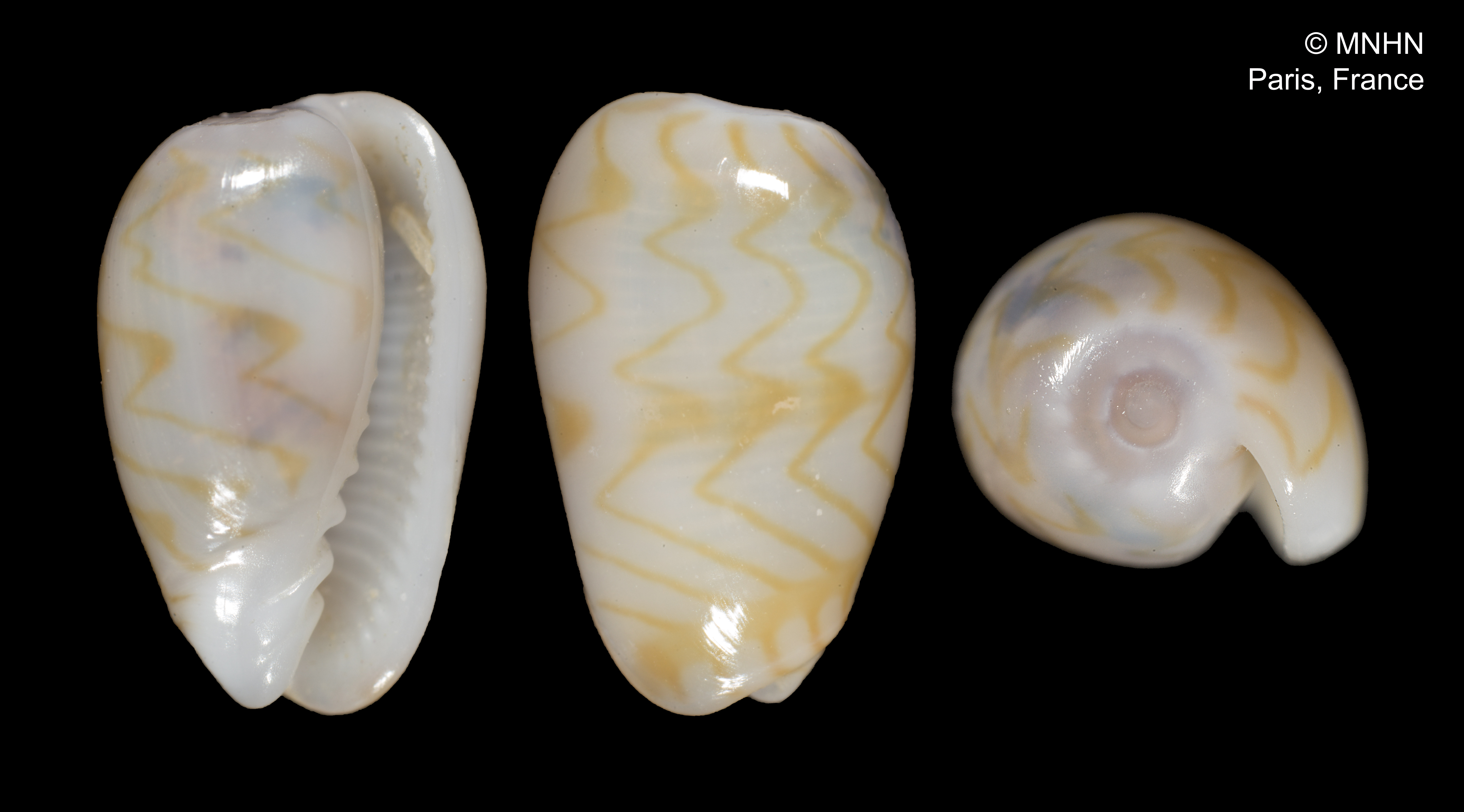
- Shell of Persicula quemeneri (holotype at MNHN, Paris)

Scientific classification
- Kingdom: Animalia
- Phylum: Mollusca
- Class: Gastropoda
- Subclass: Caenogastropoda
- Order: Neogastropoda
- Family: Cystiscidae
- Subfamily: Persiculinae
- Genus: Persicula
- Species: P. quemeneri

Binomial name
- Persicula quemeneri Cossignani, 2001

= Persicula quemeneri =

Species of gastropod

Persicula quemeneri is a species of very small sea snail, a marine gastropod mollusk or micromollusk in the family Cystiscidae.

== Distribution ==
This marine species occurs off New Caledonia.
