= Persicula hilli =

Scientific classification
- Kingdom: Animalia
- Phylum: Mollusca
- Class: Gastropoda
- Subclass: Caenogastropoda
- Order: Neogastropoda
- Family: Cystiscidae
- Subfamily: Persiculinae
- Genus: Persicula
- Species: P. hilli

Binomial name
- Persicula hilli (M. Smith, 1950)

Species of gastropod

Persicula hilli is a species of sea snail, a marine gastropod mollusk, in the family Cystiscidae.
