= Persicula calculus =

Scientific classification
- Kingdom: Animalia
- Phylum: Mollusca
- Class: Gastropoda
- Subclass: Caenogastropoda
- Order: Neogastropoda
- Family: Cystiscidae
- Genus: Persicula
- Species: P. calculus

Binomial name
- Persicula calculus (Redfield, 1870)

Species of gastropod

Persicula calculus is a species of sea snail, a marine gastropod mollusc, in the family Cystiscidae.
