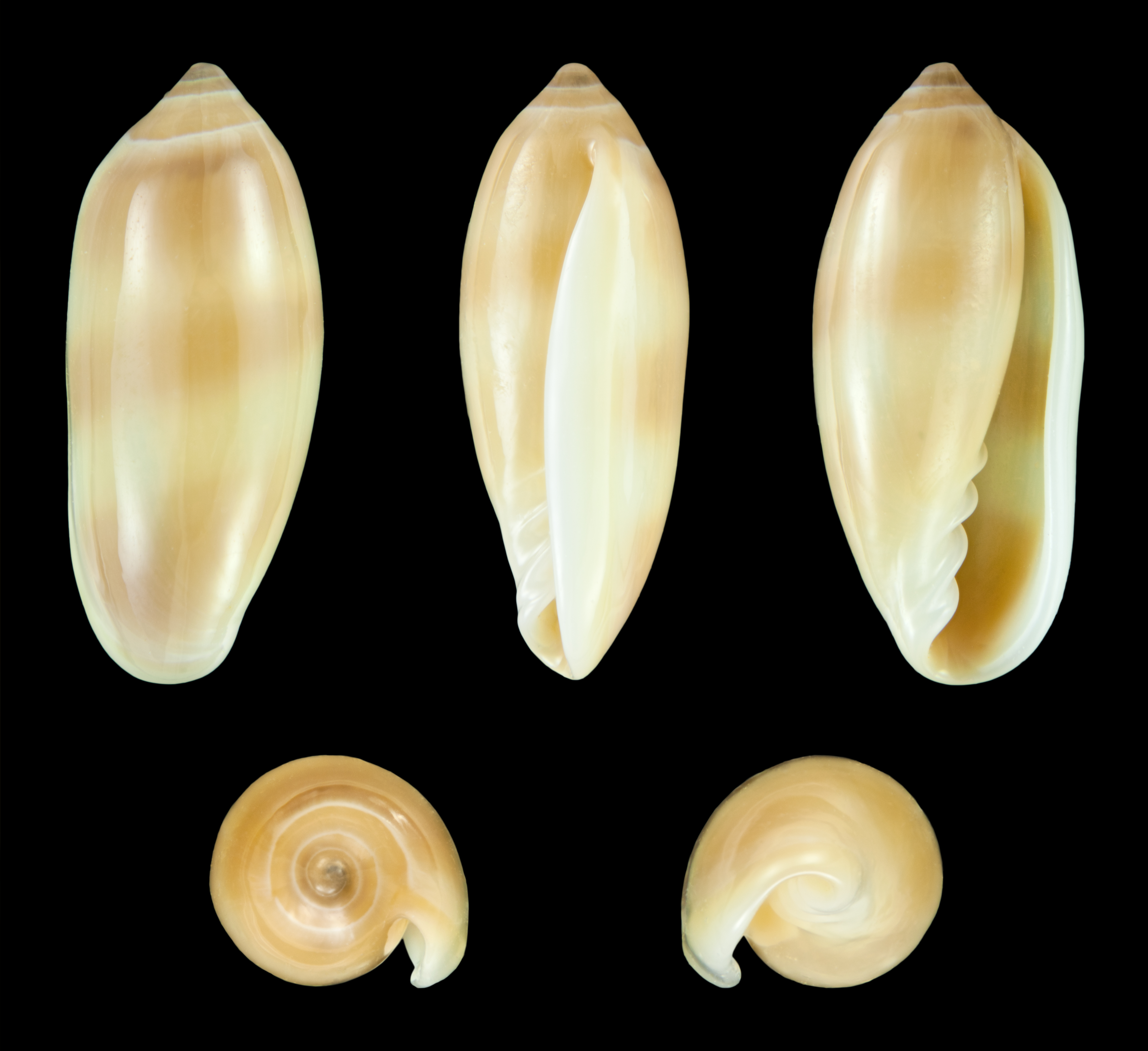
- Shell of Volvarina philippinarum

Scientific classification
- Kingdom: Animalia
- Phylum: Mollusca
- Class: Gastropoda
- Subclass: Caenogastropoda
- Order: Neogastropoda
- Family: Marginellidae
- Subfamily: Marginellinae
- Genus: Volvarina
- Species: V. philippinarum

Binomial name
- Volvarina philippinarum (Redfield, 1848)

Synonyms
- Marginella avena G. B. Sowerby II, 1846 (invalid, not Kiener, 1834 (homonym)); Marginella philippinarium Redfield, 1848 (original combination)

= Volvarina philippinarum =

Species of gastropod

Volvarina philippinarum is a species of sea snail, a marine gastropod mollusk in the family Marginellidae, the margin snails. When first described by Redfield in 1848, it was mistakenly labelled as a Marginella species.

== Description ==
The length of the shell attains 15 mm length and 7mm width. The shell itself is cylindric and a polished yellow-white, with three bands of darker yellow. The spine of the shell is short, and has 4 whorls. The suture is inconspicuous.

== Distribution ==
This marine species occurs off the Philippines and Western Australia.
