= Dentimargo pumila =

Scientific classification
- Kingdom: Animalia
- Phylum: Mollusca
- Class: Gastropoda
- Subclass: Caenogastropoda
- Order: Neogastropoda
- Family: Marginellidae
- Genus: Dentimargo
- Species: D. pumila

Binomial name
- Dentimargo pumila Redfield, 1870

Synonyms
- Marginella pusilla Adams, H.G., 1869 (nomen dubium); Marginella borbonica Jousseaume, 1875 (nomen dubium); Marginella pumila Redfield, 1870

Species of gastropod

Dentimargo pumila is a species of sea snail, a marine gastropod mollusk in the family Marginellidae, the margin snails.

== Description ==
The size of the shell is 5 mm.

== Distribution ==
This species is distributed in the Indian Ocean along Madagascar, Mauritius and Réunion; in the Pacific Ocean along Hawaii.
