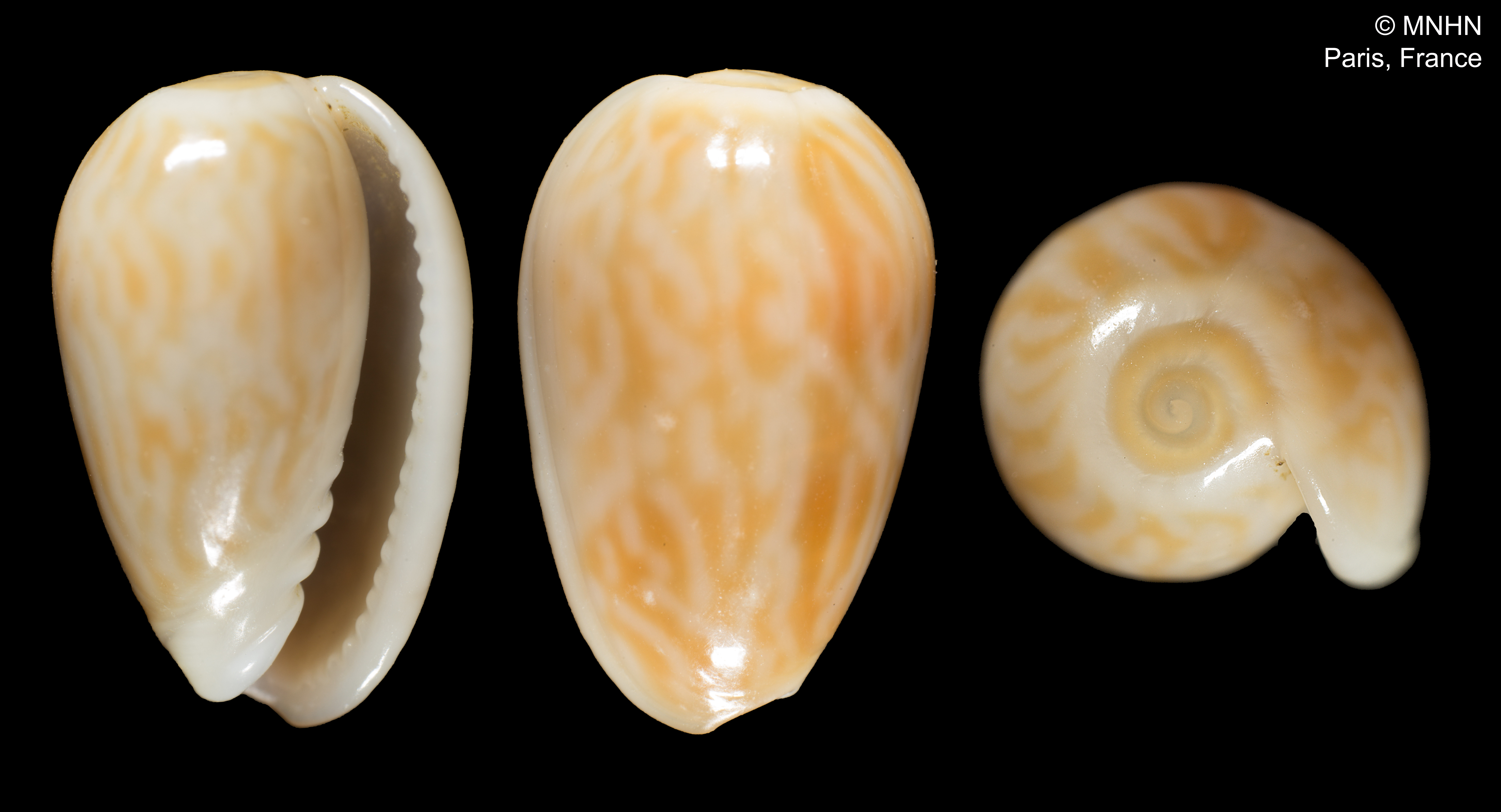
- Shell of Persicula danilai (holotype at MNHN, Paris)

Scientific classification
- Kingdom: Animalia
- Phylum: Mollusca
- Class: Gastropoda
- Subclass: Caenogastropoda
- Order: Neogastropoda
- Family: Cystiscidae
- Subfamily: Persiculinae
- Genus: Persicula
- Species: P. danilai

Binomial name
- Persicula danilai Bozzetti, 1992

= Persicula danilai =

Species of gastropod

Persicula danilai is a species of sea snail, a marine gastropod mollusk, in the family Cystiscidae.

== Distribution ==
This marine species occurs off Equatorial Africa.
