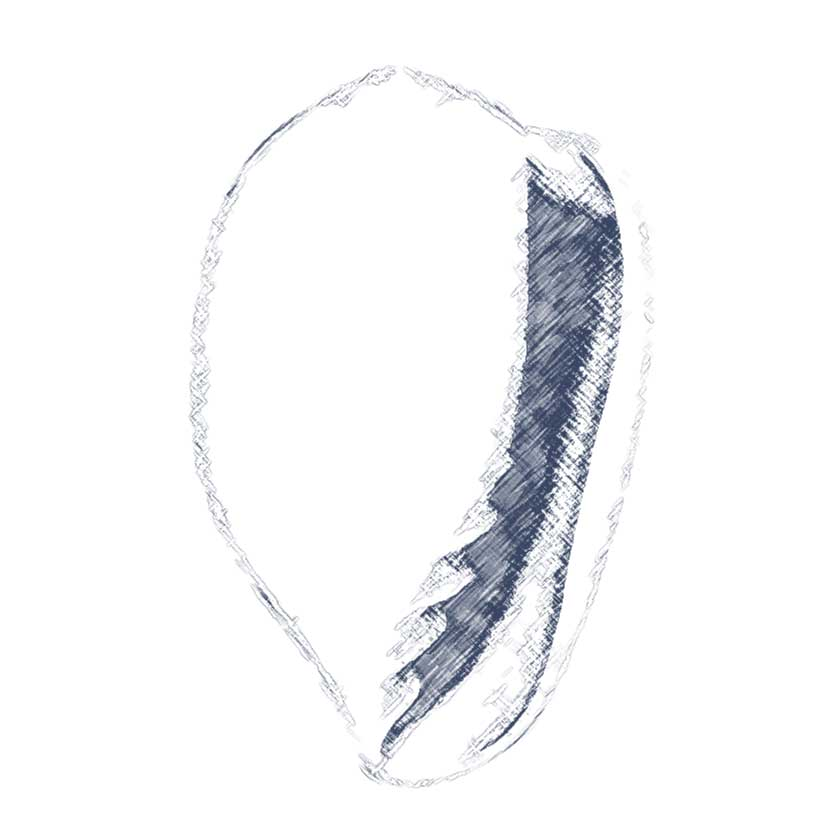

Scientific classification
- Kingdom: Animalia
- Phylum: Mollusca
- Class: Gastropoda
- Subclass: Caenogastropoda
- Order: Neogastropoda
- Family: Cystiscidae
- Subfamily: Cystiscinae
- Genus: Cystiscus
- Species: C. cystiscus

Binomial name
- Cystiscus cystiscus (Redfield, 1870)

Synonyms
- Marginella cystiscus Redfield, 1870; Cystiscus capensis Stimpson, 1865

= Cystiscus cystiscus =

Species of gastropod

Cystiscus connectans is a species of very small sea snail, a marine gastropod mollusk or micromollusk in the family Cystiscidae.
