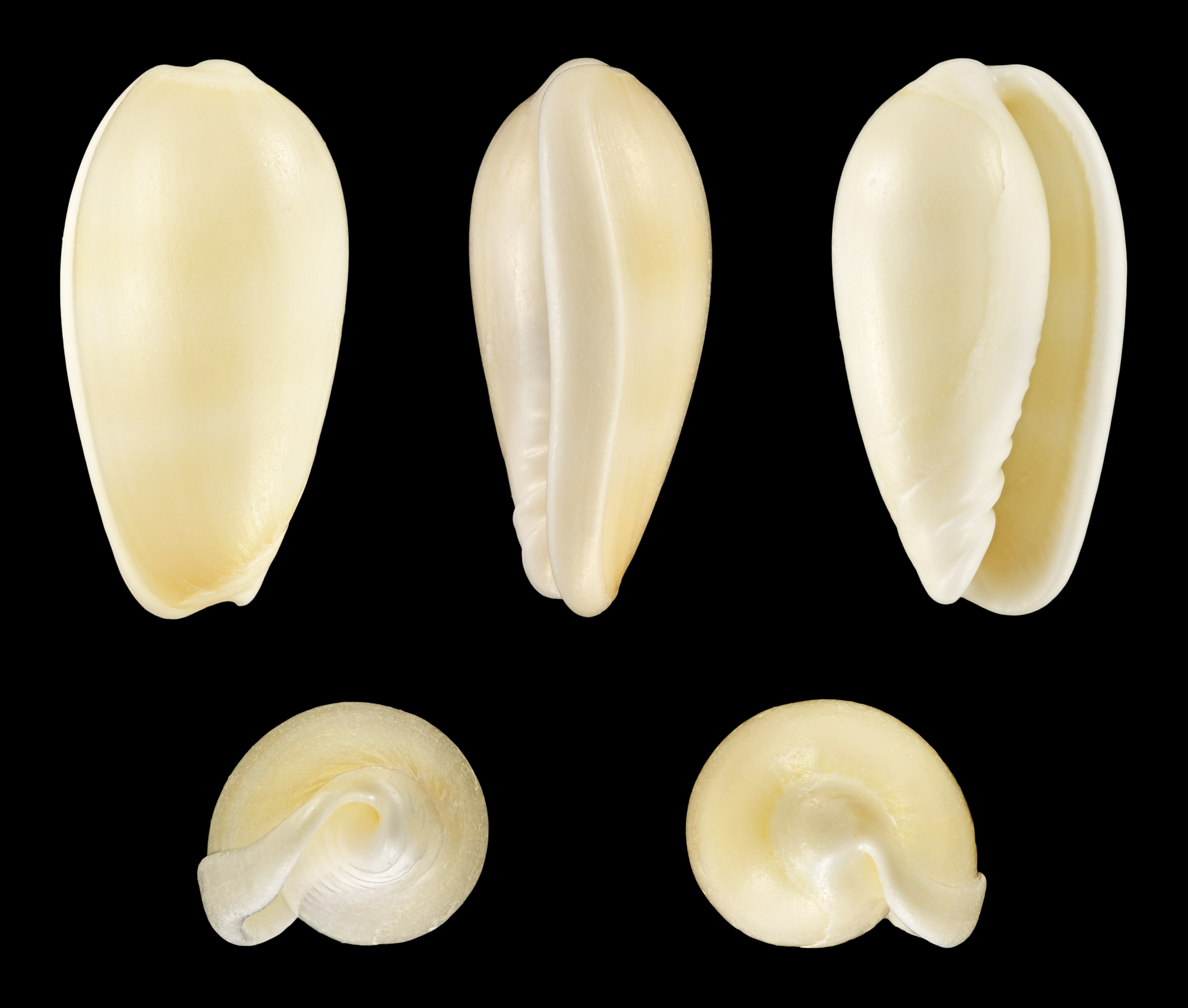
- Shells of Persicula blanda

Scientific classification
- Kingdom: Animalia
- Phylum: Mollusca
- Class: Gastropoda
- Subclass: Caenogastropoda
- Order: Neogastropoda
- Family: Cystiscidae
- Subfamily: Persiculinae
- Genus: Persicula
- Species: P. blanda

Binomial name
- Persicula blanda (Hinds, 1844)

Synonyms
- Marginella (Cryptospira) blanda Hinds, 1844 (basionym); Marginella blanda Hinds, 1844; Marginella contaminata Gaskoin, 1849; Persicula lucens Locard, 1897; Persicula saharica Locard, 1897

= Persicula blanda =

Species of gastropod

Persicula blanda is a species of sea snail, a marine gastropod mollusk, in the family Cystiscidae.

== Distribution ==
This species occurs in the Atlantic Ocean off the Western Sahara.
