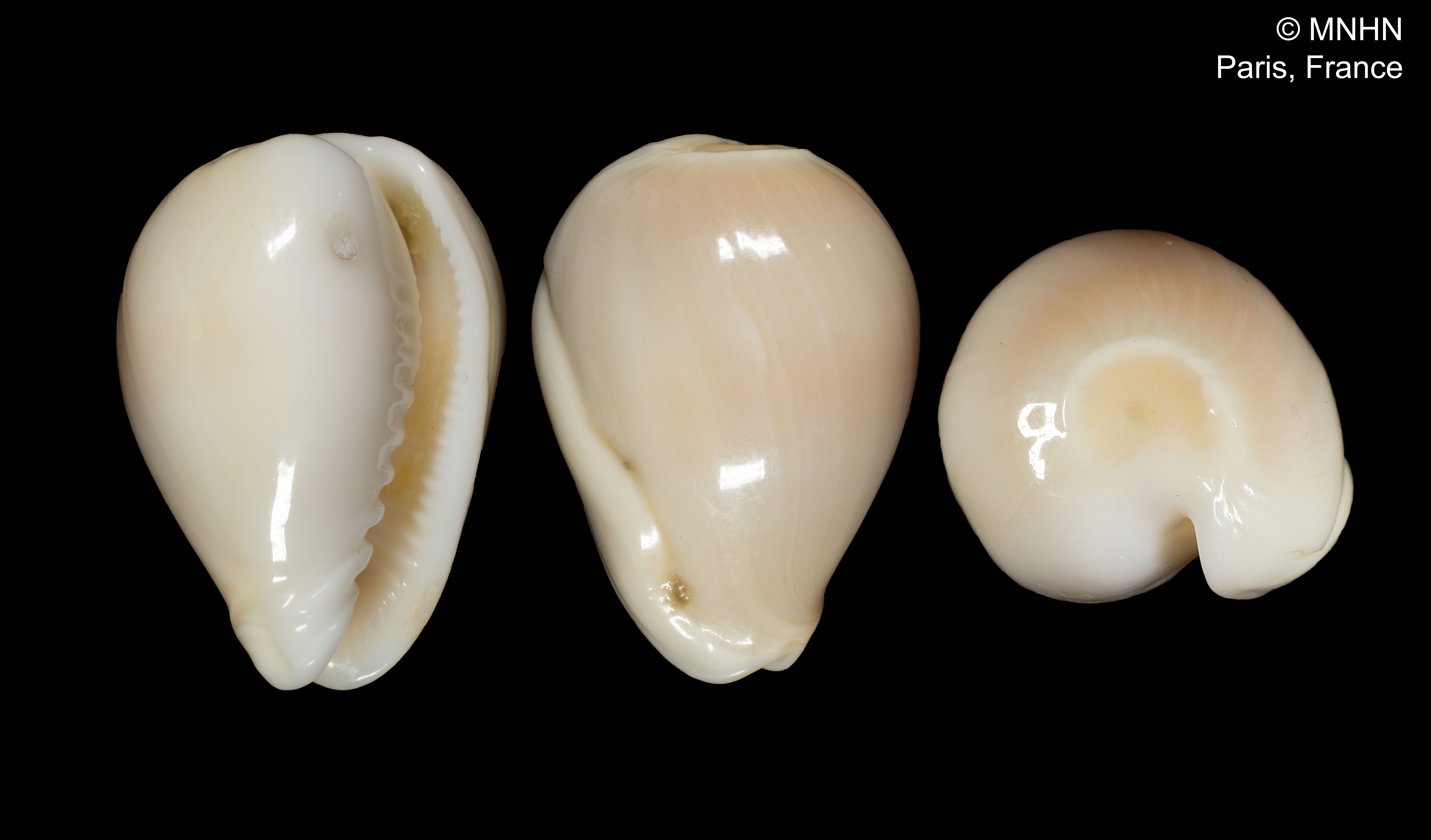
- Shell of Persicula rashafuni (holotype at MNHN, Paris)

Scientific classification
- Kingdom: Animalia
- Phylum: Mollusca
- Class: Gastropoda
- Subclass: Caenogastropoda
- Order: Neogastropoda
- Family: Cystiscidae
- Subfamily: Persiculinae
- Genus: Persicula
- Species: P. rashafuni

Binomial name
- Persicula rashafuni Bozzetti, 1993

= Persicula rashafuni =

Species of gastropod

Persicula rashafuni is a species of sea snail, a marine gastropod mollusk, in the family Cystiscidae.

== Distribution ==
This species occurs in the Indian Ocean off Somalia.
