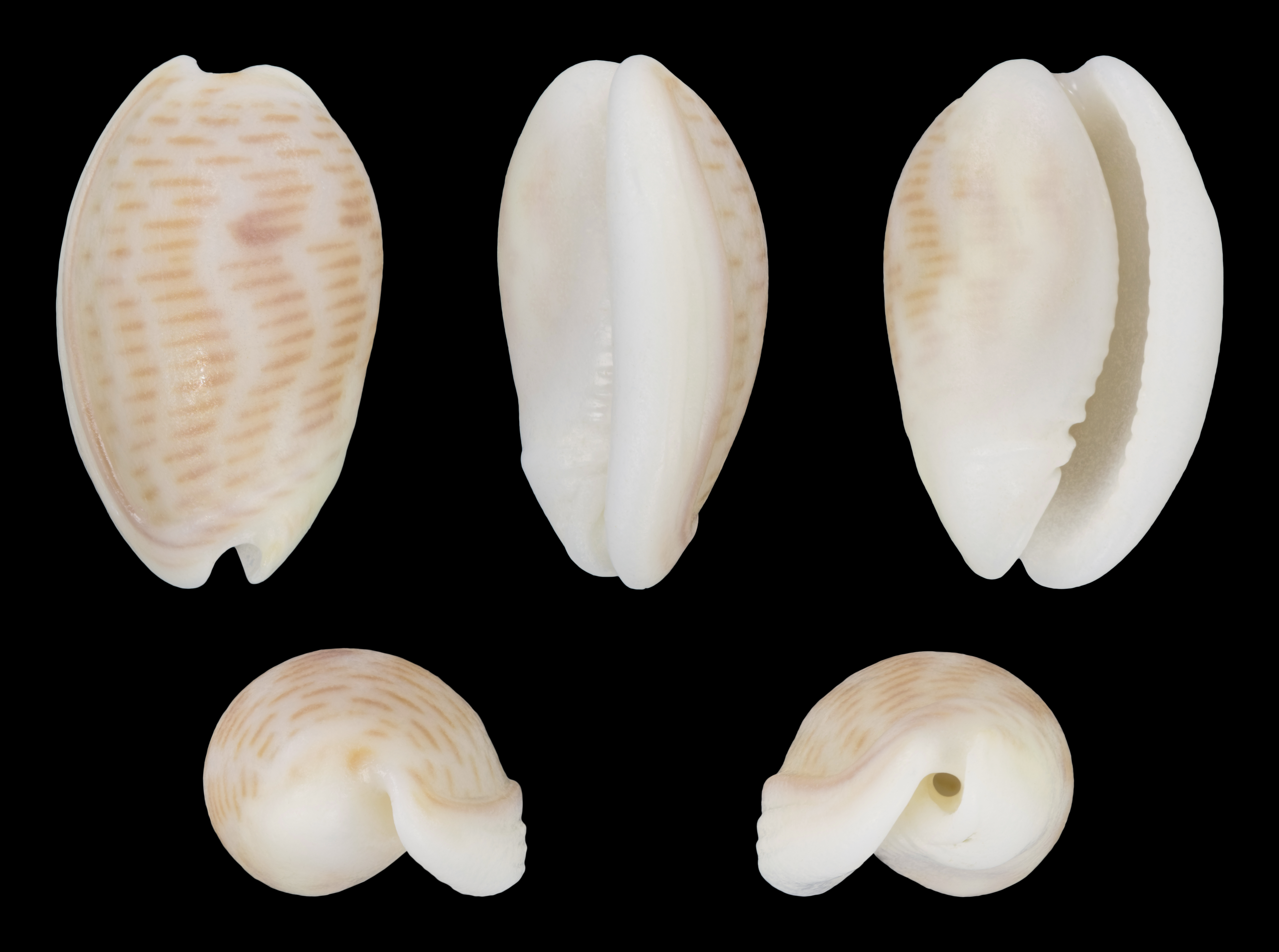

Scientific classification
- Kingdom: Animalia
- Phylum: Mollusca
- Class: Gastropoda
- Subclass: Caenogastropoda
- Order: Neogastropoda
- Family: Cystiscidae
- Subfamily: Persiculinae
- Genus: Persicula
- Species: P. bagne

Binomial name
- Persicula bagne (Megerle von Mühlfeld, 1816)

Synonyms
- Marginella interrupta Lamarck, 1822; Voluta interruptolineata Megerle von Mühlfeld, 1816

= Persicula interruptolineata =

Species of gastropod

Persicula interruptolineata is a species of sea snail, a marine gastropod mollusk, in the family Cystiscidae.
