= Persicula robusta =

Scientific classification
- Kingdom: Animalia
- Phylum: Mollusca
- Class: Gastropoda
- Subclass: Caenogastropoda
- Order: Neogastropoda
- Family: Cystiscidae
- Subfamily: Persiculinae
- Genus: Persicula
- Species: P. robusta

Binomial name
- Persicula robusta (Sowerby III, 1904)

Synonyms
- Marginella robusta Sowerby III, 1904

Species of gastropod

Persicula robusta is a species of sea snail, a marine gastropod mollusk, in the family Cystiscidae.
