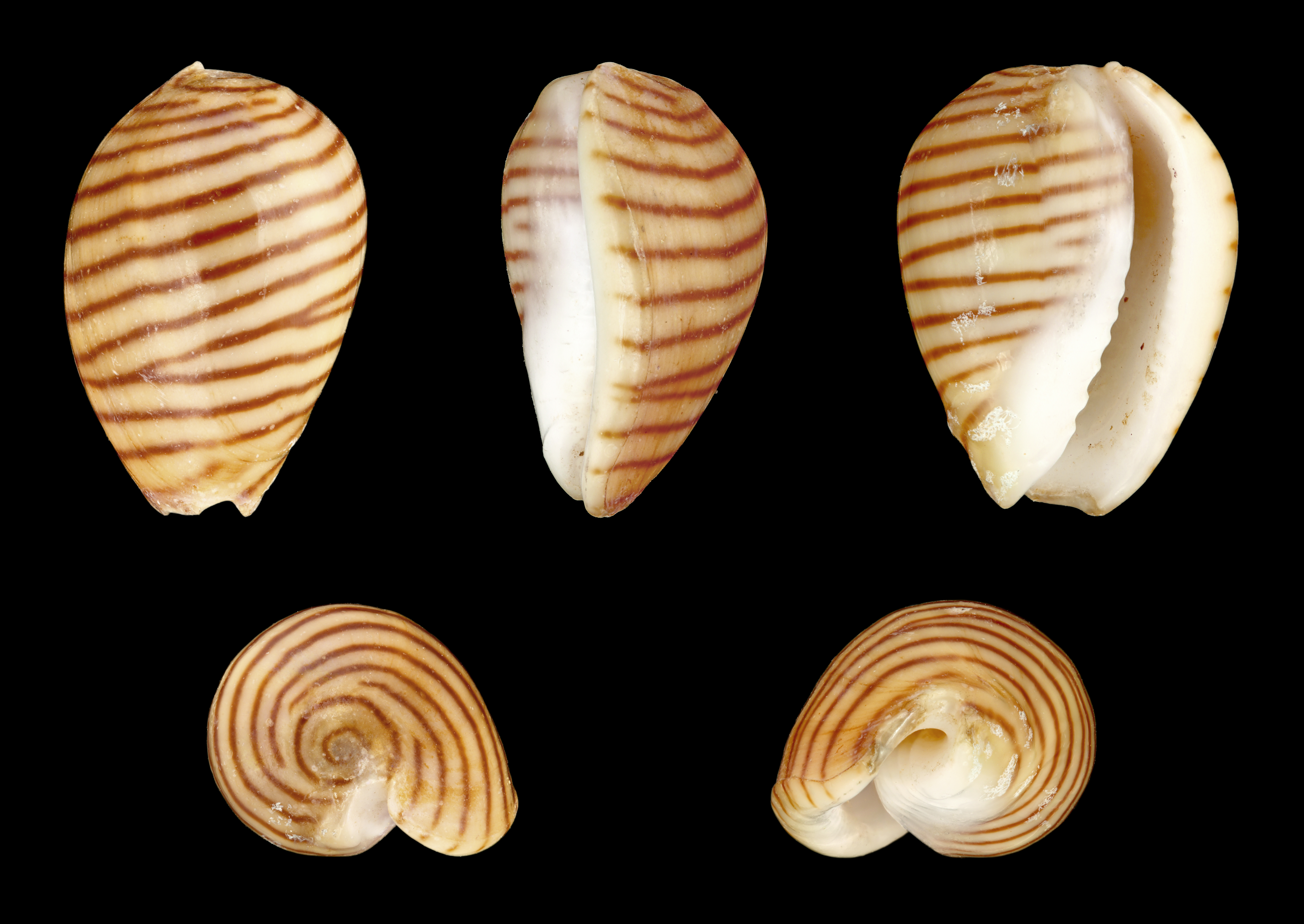

Scientific classification
- Kingdom: Animalia
- Phylum: Mollusca
- Class: Gastropoda
- Subclass: Caenogastropoda
- Order: Neogastropoda
- Family: Cystiscidae
- Subfamily: Persiculinae
- Genus: Persicula
- Species: P. cingulata

Binomial name
- Persicula cingulata (Dillwyn, 1817)

Synonyms
- Marginella (Persicula) persiculocingulata Tournier, 1997 (original combination); Marginella persiculocingulata Tournier, 1997 ·; Marginella vittata Hutton, 1873; Persicula persiculocingulata (Tournier, 1997); Voluta cingulata Dillwyn, 1817 (original combination)

= Persicula cingulata =

Species of gastropod

Persicula cingulata is a species of very small sea snail, a marine gastropod mollusk or micromollusk in the family Cystiscidae.

== Description ==
(Described as Marginella vittata) The shell has a subcylindrical shape and is rather flattened below. The spire is concealed. The columella shows four or five plaits near the anterior end. The outer lip is not thickened (youug specimen ?). The shell is yellowish white, with thin interrupted spiral bands of brown. The columella is white.

== Distribution ==
This marine species occurs off Senegal, Mauritania and the Cape Verdes; also off New Zealand.
