= Persicula pulcherrima =

Scientific classification
- Kingdom: Animalia
- Phylum: Mollusca
- Class: Gastropoda
- Subclass: Caenogastropoda
- Order: Neogastropoda
- Family: Cystiscidae
- Subfamily: Persiculinae
- Genus: Persicula
- Species: P. pulcherrima

Binomial name
- Persicula pulcherrima (Gaskoin, 1849)

Species of gastropod

Persicula pulcherrima is a species of sea snail, a marine gastropod mollusk, in the family Cystiscidae.

== Distribution ==
This species occurs in Aruba, Belize, Bonaire, Caribbean Sea, Colombia, Cuba, Curaçao, Lesser Antilles, Puerto Rico and San Andrés
