= Persicula hennequini =

Scientific classification
- Kingdom: Animalia
- Phylum: Mollusca
- Class: Gastropoda
- Subclass: Caenogastropoda
- Order: Neogastropoda
- Family: Cystiscidae
- Subfamily: Persiculinae
- Genus: Persicula
- Species: P. hennequini

Binomial name
- Persicula hennequini Boyer, Neefs & Wakefield, 1998

Species of gastropod

Persicula hennequini is a species of very small sea snail, a marine gastropod mollusk or micromollusk in the family Cystiscidae.
