= Persicula deburghi =

Scientific classification
- Kingdom: Animalia
- Phylum: Mollusca
- Class: Gastropoda
- Subclass: Caenogastropoda
- Order: Neogastropoda
- Family: Cystiscidae
- Subfamily: Persiculinae
- Genus: Persicula
- Species: P. deburghi

Binomial name
- Persicula deburghi (Adams, 1864)

Synonyms
- Marginella deburghi Adams, 1864

Species of gastropod

Persicula deburghi is a species of sea snail, a marine gastropod mollusk, in the family Cystiscidae.
