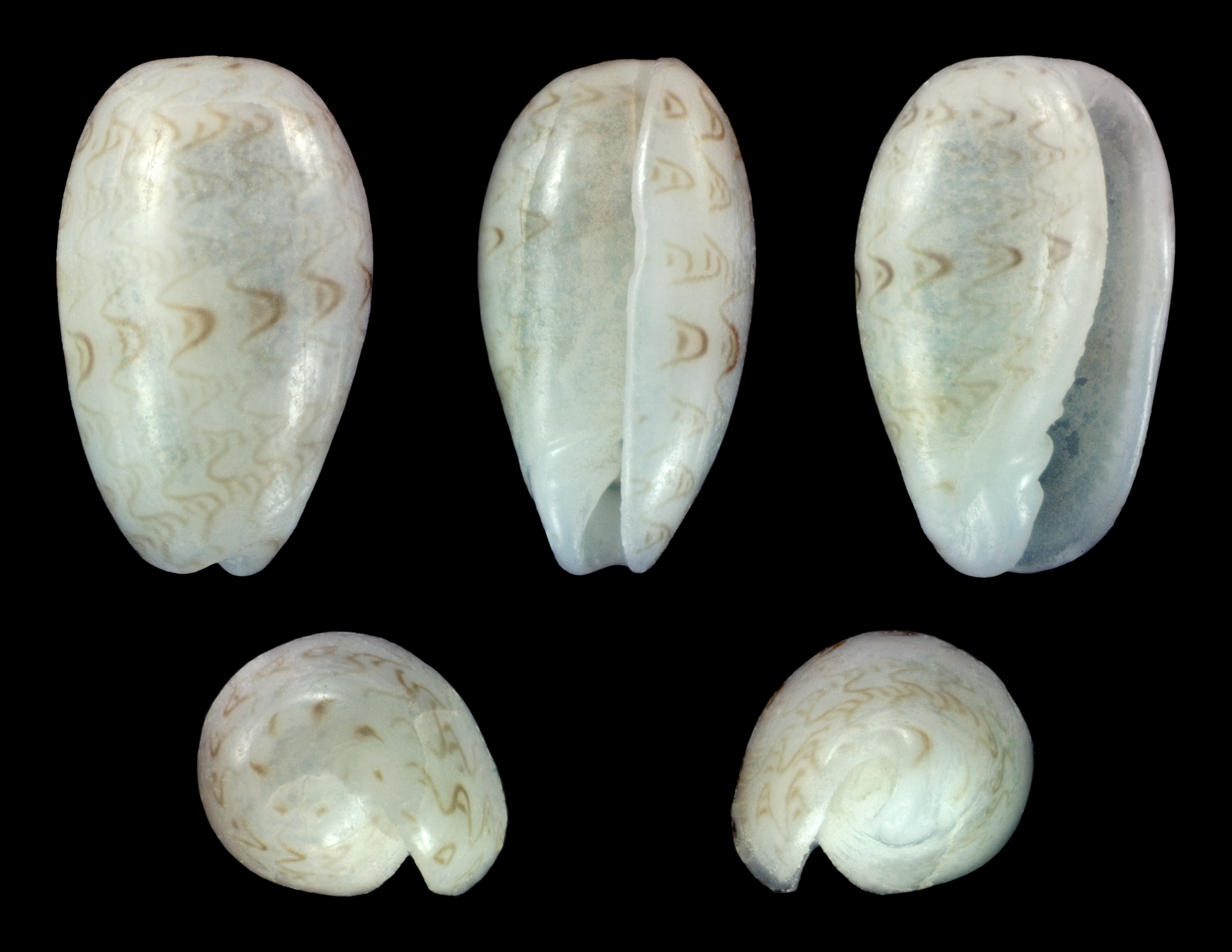

Scientific classification
- Kingdom: Animalia
- Phylum: Mollusca
- Class: Gastropoda
- Subclass: Caenogastropoda
- Order: Neogastropoda
- Family: Cystiscidae
- Subfamily: Persiculinae
- Genus: Persicula
- Species: P. shepstonensis

Binomial name
- Persicula shepstonensis (Smith, 1906)

Synonyms
- Marginella shepstonensis Smith, 1906

= Persicula shepstonensis =

Species of gastropod

Persicula shepstonensis is a species of sea snail, a marine gastropod mollusk, in the family Cystiscidae.
