= Persicula accola =

Scientific classification
- Kingdom: Animalia
- Phylum: Mollusca
- Class: Gastropoda
- Subclass: Caenogastropoda
- Order: Neogastropoda
- Family: Cystiscidae
- Subfamily: Persiculinae
- Genus: Persicula
- Species: P. accola

Binomial name
- Persicula accola Roth & Coan, 1968

Species of gastropod

Persicula accola, common names twinned margin shell, twinned marginella, twinned marginsnail, is a species of sea snail, a marine gastropod mollusk, in the family Cystiscidae.
