= Persicula persicula =

- Persicula persicula

Scientific classification
- Kingdom: Animalia
- Phylum: Mollusca
- Class: Gastropoda
- Subclass: Caenogastropoda
- Order: Neogastropoda
- Family: Cystiscidae
- Subfamily: Persiculinae
- Genus: Persicula
- Species: P. persicula

Binomial name
- Persicula persicula (Linnaeus, 1758)

Synonyms
- Marginella persicula (Linnaeus, 1758); Marginella punctata (Martini, 1771); Marginella bobi (Fischer von Waldheim, 1807); Persicula guttata Link, 1807; Marginella variabilis Schumacher, 1817; Persicula variabilis Schumacher, 1817; Persicula maculata Swainson, 1840; Persicula persiculocingulata Tournier, 1997; Prunum roscidum f. spilota Mazyck, 1911; Voluta persicula Linnaeus, 1758 (original combination)

Species of gastropod

Persicula persicula, common name: the spotted marginella, is a species of very small sea snail, a marine gastropod mollusk or micromollusk in the family Cystiscidae.

== Description ==
The shell size varies between 13 mm and 25 mm.

== Distribution ==
This species occurs in the Atlantic Ocean off Cape Verde, Mauritania and Liberia.
