= Persicula porcellana =

Scientific classification
- Kingdom: Animalia
- Phylum: Mollusca
- Class: Gastropoda
- Subclass: Caenogastropoda
- Order: Neogastropoda
- Family: Cystiscidae
- Subfamily: Persiculinae
- Genus: Persicula
- Species: P. porcellana

Binomial name
- Persicula porcellana (Gmelin, 1791)

Synonyms
- Voluta albida Bosc, 1801; Voluta porcellana Gmelin, 1791

Species of gastropod

Persicula porcellana is a species of sea snail, a marine gastropod mollusk, in the family Cystiscidae.
