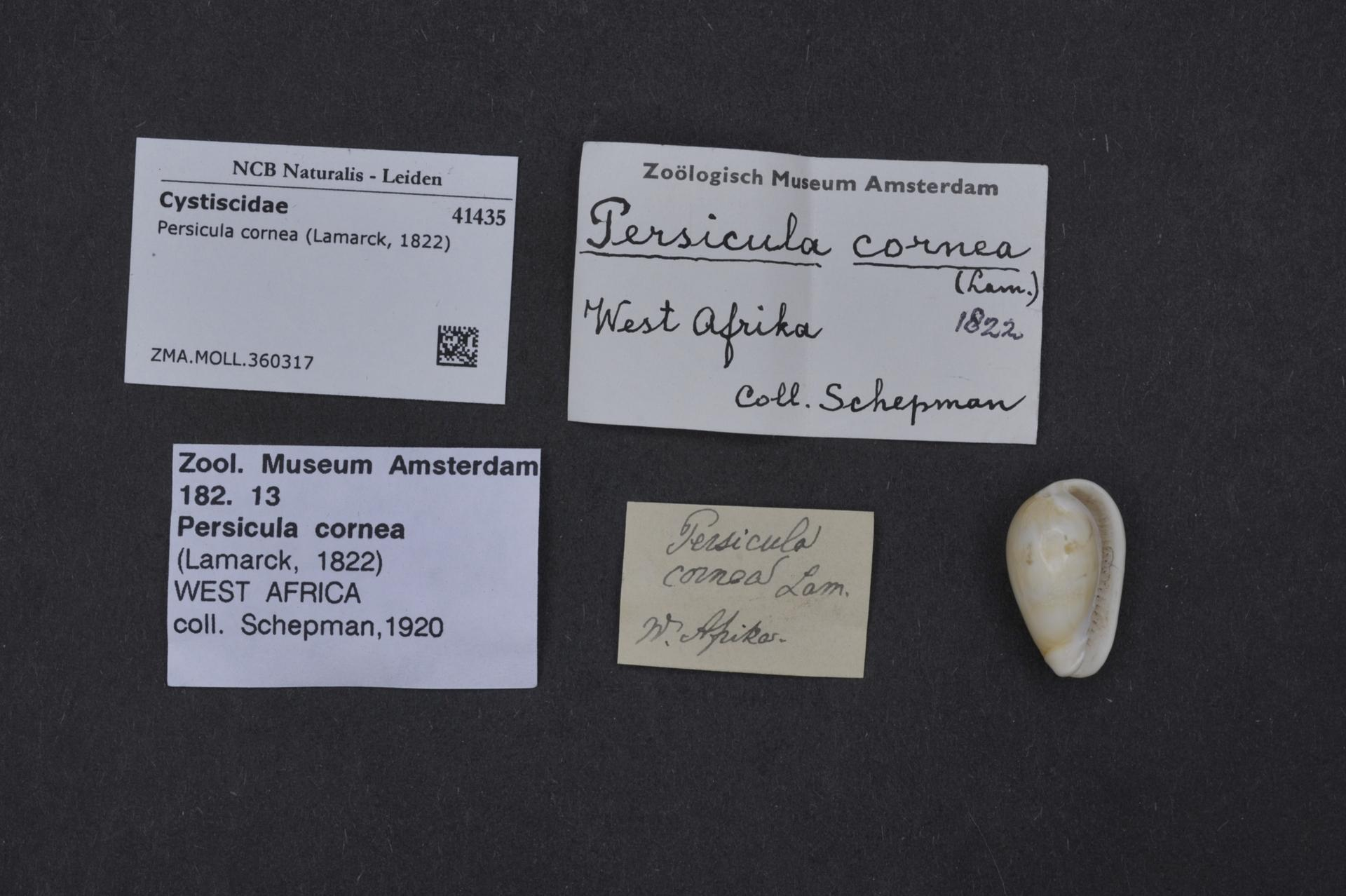

Scientific classification
- Kingdom: Animalia
- Phylum: Mollusca
- Class: Gastropoda
- Subclass: Caenogastropoda
- Order: Neogastropoda
- Family: Cystiscidae
- Subfamily: Persiculinae
- Genus: Persicula
- Species: P. cornea

Binomial name
- Persicula cornea (Lamarck, 1822)

Synonyms
- Marginella cornea Lamarck, 1822; Marginella cypraeacea Bory de Saint-Vincent, 1827

= Persicula cornea =

Species of gastropod

Persicula cornea is a species of very small sea snail, a marine gastropod mollusk or micromollusk in the family Cystiscidae.
