= Volvarina elliptica =

Scientific classification
- Kingdom: Animalia
- Phylum: Mollusca
- Class: Gastropoda
- Subclass: Caenogastropoda
- Order: Neogastropoda
- Family: Marginellidae
- Subfamily: Marginellinae
- Genus: Volvarina
- Species: V. elliptica

Binomial name
- Volvarina elliptica (Redfield, 1870)

Synonyms
- Marginella elliptica Redfield, 1870 (original combination); Volutella elongata Pease, 1868; Volvarina elongata (Pease, 1868) ·

Species of gastropod

Volvarina elliptica is a species of sea snail, a marine gastropod mollusk in the family Marginellidae, the margin snails.

== Description ==
The length of the shell attains 9.5 mm, its diameter 3.5 mm.

(Described as Volutella elongata) The elongate shell is somewhat cylindrical and smooth. The shell is white, faintly banded with yellowish. The spire is very short. The outer lip is slightly thickened externally and involute. The aperture is narrow, linear and slightly expanded at base. The columella is four-plaited, laminately callous at the base.

== Distribution ==
This marine species occurs off Tabuaeran, Kiribati, Central Pacific Ocean.
