= Pachybathron olssoni =

Scientific classification
- Kingdom: Animalia
- Phylum: Mollusca
- Class: Gastropoda
- Subclass: Caenogastropoda
- Order: Neogastropoda
- Family: Cystiscidae
- Subfamily: Cystiscinae
- Genus: Pachybathron
- Species: P. olssoni

Binomial name
- Pachybathron olssoni Wakefield, Boyer & McCleery, 2002

Species of gastropod

Pachybathron olssoni is a species of very small sea snail, a marine gastropod mollusk or micromollusk in the family Cystiscidae.

== Description ==
"Members of the order Neogastropoda are mostly gonochoric and broadcast spawners. Embryos develop into planktonic trochophore larvae and later into juvenile veligers before becoming fully grown adults."
