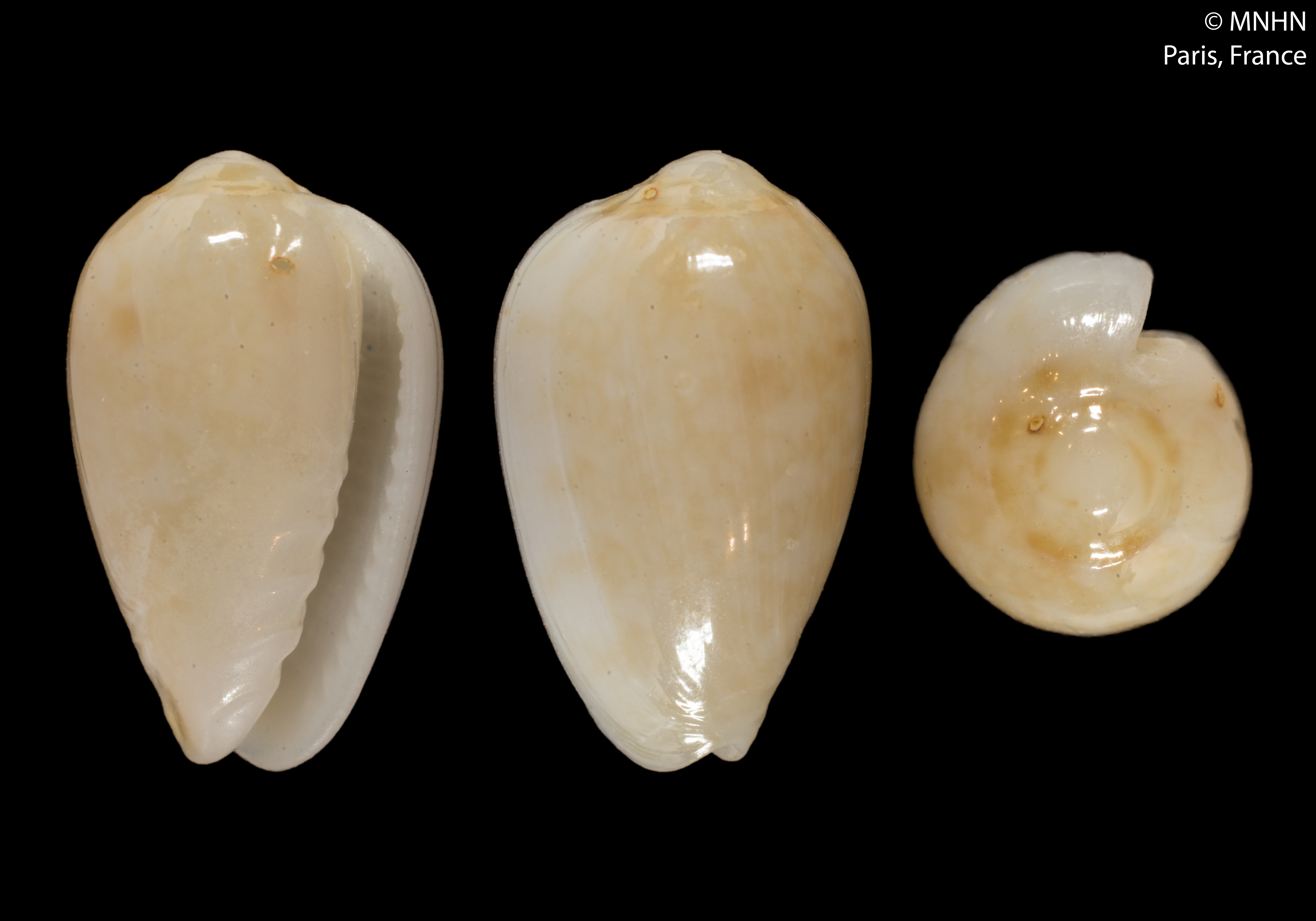
- Shell of Pachybathron guadeloupense (holotype at MNHN, Paris)

Scientific classification
- Kingdom: Animalia
- Phylum: Mollusca
- Class: Gastropoda
- Subclass: Caenogastropoda
- Order: Neogastropoda
- Family: Cystiscidae
- Subfamily: Cystiscinae
- Genus: Pachybathron
- Species: P. guadeloupense

Binomial name
- Pachybathron guadeloupense Boyer & Lamy, 2014

Synonyms
- Pachybathron guadeloupensis Boyer & Lamy, 2014 (wrong gender agreement of specific epithet)

= Pachybathron guadeloupense =

Species of gastropod

Pachybathron guadeloupense is a species of sea snail, a marine gastropod mollusk, in the family Cystiscidae.

== Distribution ==
This species occurs in Guadeloupe.
