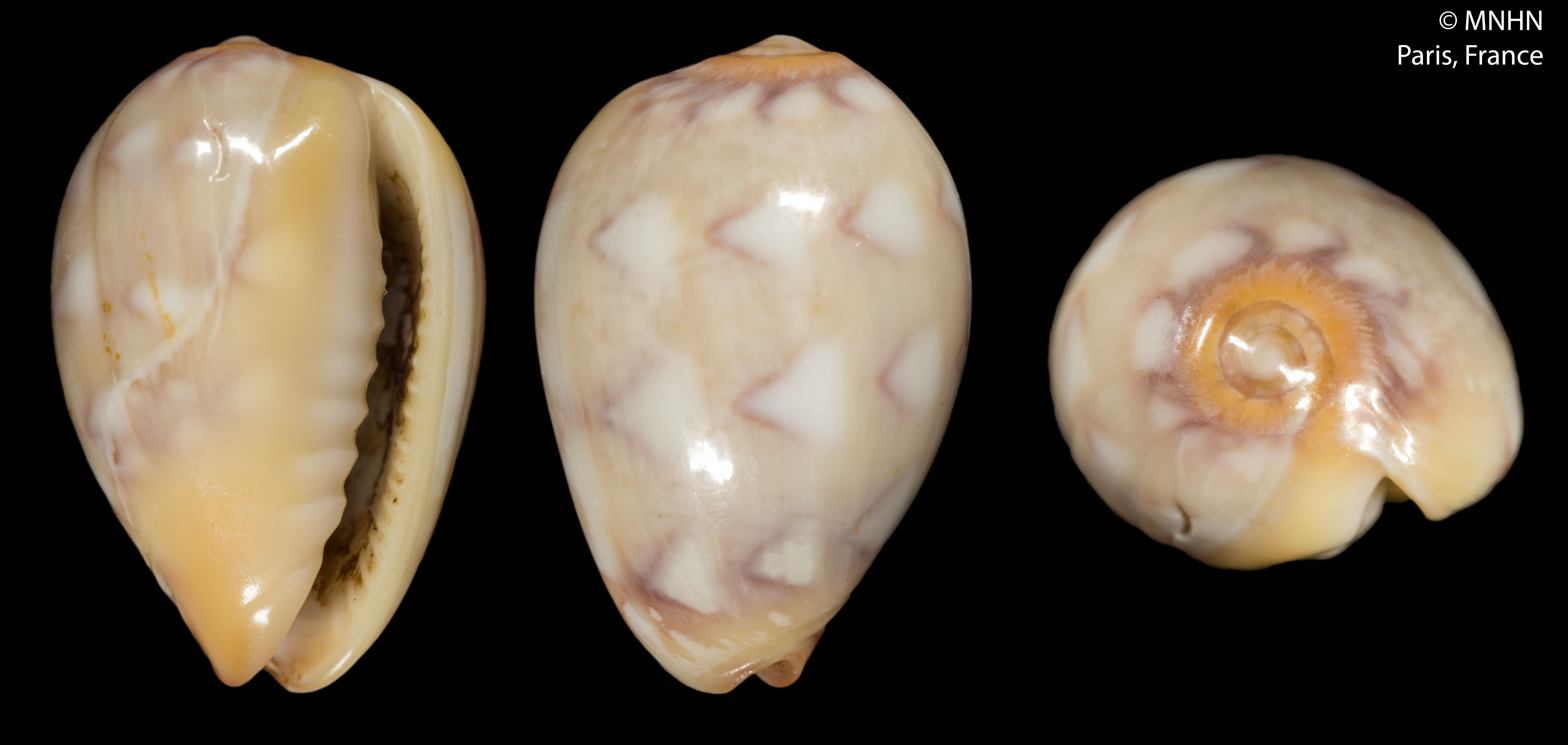
- Shell of Pachybathron kienerianum (syntype at MNHN, Paris)

Scientific classification
- Kingdom: Animalia
- Phylum: Mollusca
- Class: Gastropoda
- Subclass: Caenogastropoda
- Order: Neogastropoda
- Family: Cystiscidae
- Subfamily: Cystiscinae
- Genus: Pachybathron
- Species: P. kienerianum

Binomial name
- Pachybathron kienerianum (Petit de la Saussaye, 1838)

Synonyms
- Marginella kieneriana Petit de la Saussaye, 1838

= Pachybathron kienerianum =

Species of gastropod

Pachybathron kienerianum is a species of sea snail, a marine gastropod mollusk, in the family Cystiscidae.

== Distribution ==
This marine species occurs off Venezuela.
