= Pachybathron cassidiforme =

Scientific classification
- Kingdom: Animalia
- Phylum: Mollusca
- Class: Gastropoda
- Subclass: Caenogastropoda
- Order: Neogastropoda
- Family: Cystiscidae
- Subfamily: Cystiscinae
- Genus: Pachybathron
- Species: P. cassidiforme

Binomial name
- Pachybathron cassidiforme Gaskoin, 1853

Synonyms
- Microcassis colettae Paulmier, 1997

Species of gastropod

Pachybathron cassidiforme is a species of sea snail, a marine gastropod mollusk, in the family Cystiscidae.
