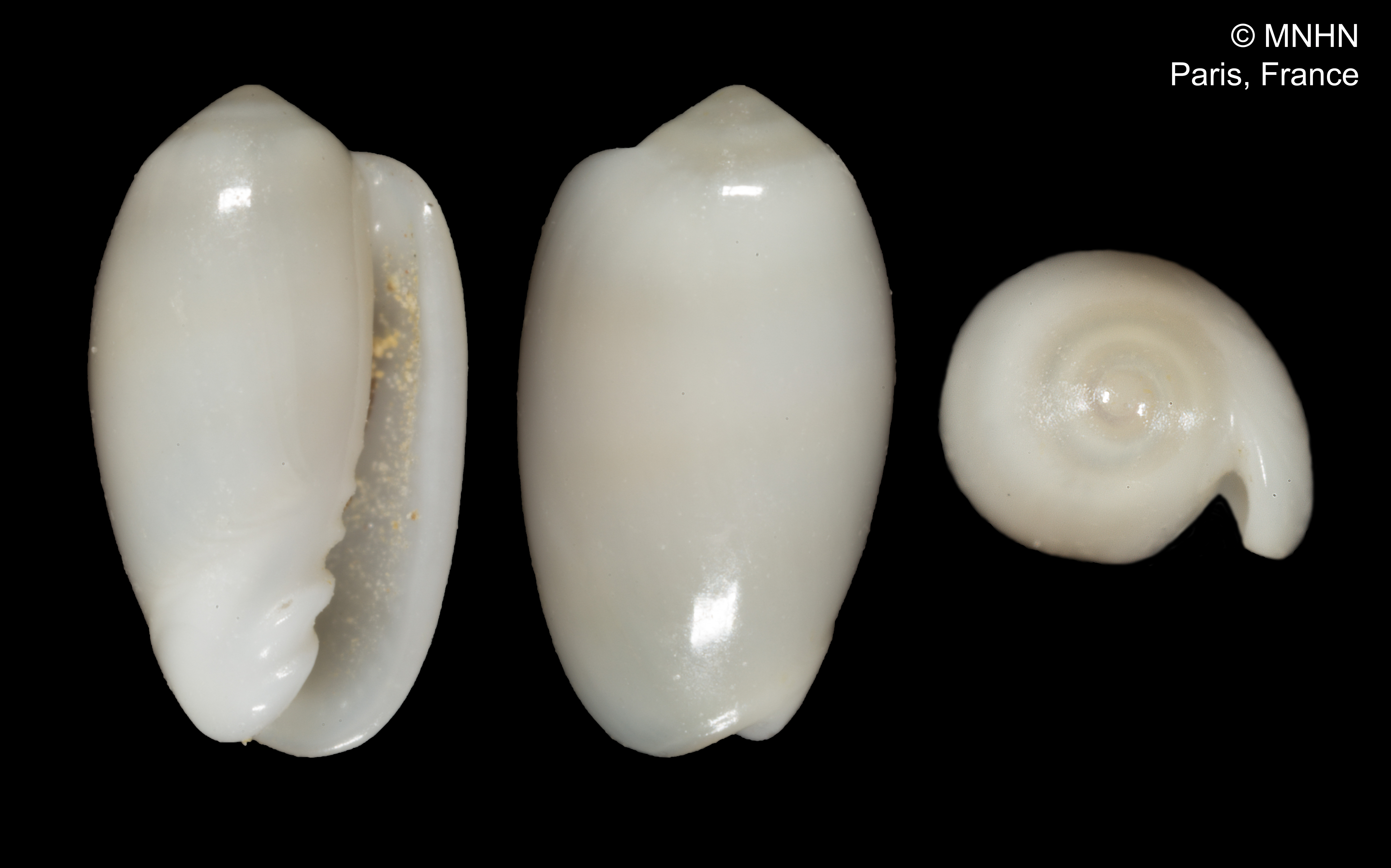
- Shell of Gibberula chudeaui (holotype at MNHN, Paris)

Scientific classification
- Kingdom: Animalia
- Phylum: Mollusca
- Class: Gastropoda
- Subclass: Caenogastropoda
- Order: Neogastropoda
- Family: Cystiscidae
- Subfamily: Cystiscinae
- Genus: Gibberula
- Species: G. chudeaui

Binomial name
- Gibberula chudeaui (Bavay, 1922)

Synonyms
- Marginella chudeaui Bavay in Dautzenberg, 1910 (original combination); Persicula chudeaui Bavay

= Gibberula chudeaui =

Species of gastropod

Gibberula chudeaui is a species of very small sea snail, a marine gastropod mollusk or micromollusk in the family Cystiscidae.

== Distribution ==
This species occurs off the Banc d'Arguin in the North Atlantic Ocean.
