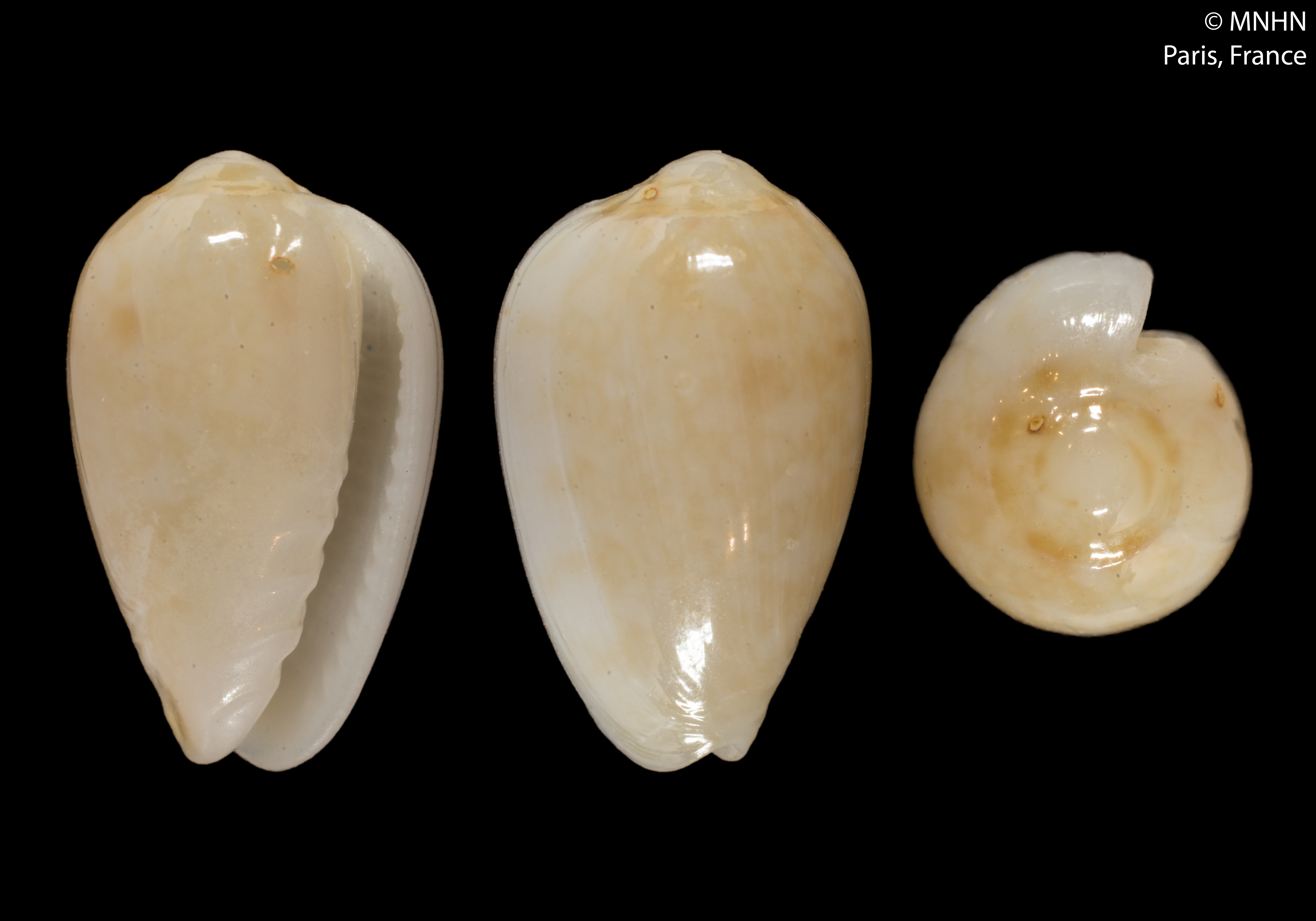
- Shell of Pachybathron guadeloupense (holotype at MNHN, Paris)

Scientific classification
- Kingdom: Animalia
- Phylum: Mollusca
- Class: Gastropoda
- Subclass: Caenogastropoda
- Order: Neogastropoda
- Family: Cystiscidae
- Subfamily: Cystiscinae
- Genus: Pachybathron; Gaskoin, 1853

Type species
- Pachybathron cassidiforme Gaskoin, 1853

= Pachybathron =

Genus of gastropods

Pachybathron is a genus of very small sea snails, marine gastropod mollusk or micromollusk in the subfamily Cystiscinae of the family Cystiscidae.

== Species ==
Species within the genus Pachybathron include:

- Pachybathron cassidiforme Gaskoin, 1853
- Pachybathron cypraeoides (Adams, 1845)
- Pachybathron guadeloupense Boyer & Lamy, 2014
- Pachybathron kienerianum (Petit de la Saussaye, 1838)
- Pachybathron olssoni Wakefield, Boyer & McCleery, 2002
- Pachybathron tayrona Díaz & Velásquez, 1987

Synonym:

- Pachybathron guadeloupensis Boyer & Lamy, 2014: synonym of Pachybathron guadeloupense Boyer & Lamy, 2014 (wrong gender agreement of specific epithet)
- Pachybathron marginelloideum Gaskoin, 1853: synonym of Pachybathron cypraeoides (Adams, 1845)
