= Pachybathron tayrona =

Scientific classification
- Kingdom: Animalia
- Phylum: Mollusca
- Class: Gastropoda
- Subclass: Caenogastropoda
- Order: Neogastropoda
- Family: Cystiscidae
- Subfamily: Cystiscinae
- Genus: Pachybathron
- Species: P. tayrona

Binomial name
- Pachybathron tayrona Díaz & Velásquez, 1987

Species of gastropod

Pachybathron tayrona is a species of sea snail, a marine gastropod mollusk, in the family Cystiscidae.
