= Gibberula pulchella =

Scientific classification
- Kingdom: Animalia
- Phylum: Mollusca
- Class: Gastropoda
- Subclass: Caenogastropoda
- Order: Neogastropoda
- Family: Cystiscidae
- Subfamily: Cystiscinae
- Genus: Gibberula
- Species: G. pulchella

Binomial name
- Gibberula pulchella (Kiener, 1834)

Synonyms
- Marginella pulchella Kiener, 1834; Persicula pulchella (Kiener, 1834)

Species of gastropod

Gibberula pulchella is a species of sea snail, a marine gastropod mollusk, in the family Cystiscidae.
