= Gibberula aldridgei =

Scientific classification
- Kingdom: Animalia
- Phylum: Mollusca
- Class: Gastropoda
- Subclass: Caenogastropoda
- Order: Neogastropoda
- Family: Cystiscidae
- Subfamily: Cystiscinae
- Genus: Gibberula
- Species: G. aldridgei

Binomial name
- Gibberula aldridgei (Nowell-Usticke, 1969)

Synonyms
- Persicula aldridgei Nowell-Usticke, 1969

Species of gastropod

Gibberula aldridgei is a species of sea snail, a marine gastropod mollusk, in the family Cystiscidae.

This is a taxon inquirendum.

== Distribution ==
This marine species occurs off the Virgin Islands.
