= Pachybathron cypraeoides =

Scientific classification
- Kingdom: Animalia
- Phylum: Mollusca
- Class: Gastropoda
- Subclass: Caenogastropoda
- Order: Neogastropoda
- Family: Cystiscidae
- Subfamily: Cystiscinae
- Genus: Pachybathron
- Species: P. cypraeoides

Binomial name
- Pachybathron cypraeoides (Adams, 1845)

Synonyms
- Erato cypraeoides Adams, 1845; Pachybathron marginelloideum Gaskoin, 1853

Species of gastropod

Pachybathron cypraeoides is a species of sea snail, a marine gastropod mollusk, in the family Cystiscidae.
