= Gibberula maldiviana =

Scientific classification
- Kingdom: Animalia
- Phylum: Mollusca
- Class: Gastropoda
- Subclass: Caenogastropoda
- Order: Neogastropoda
- Family: Cystiscidae
- Subfamily: Cystiscinae
- Genus: Gibberula
- Species: G. maldiviana

Binomial name
- Gibberula maldiviana (T. Cossignani, 2001)

Synonyms
- Persicula maldiviana T. Cossignani, 2001

Species of gastropod

Gibberula maldiviana is a species of sea snail, a marine gastropod mollusk, in the family Cystiscidae.

== Distribution ==
This species occurs in Maldives.
