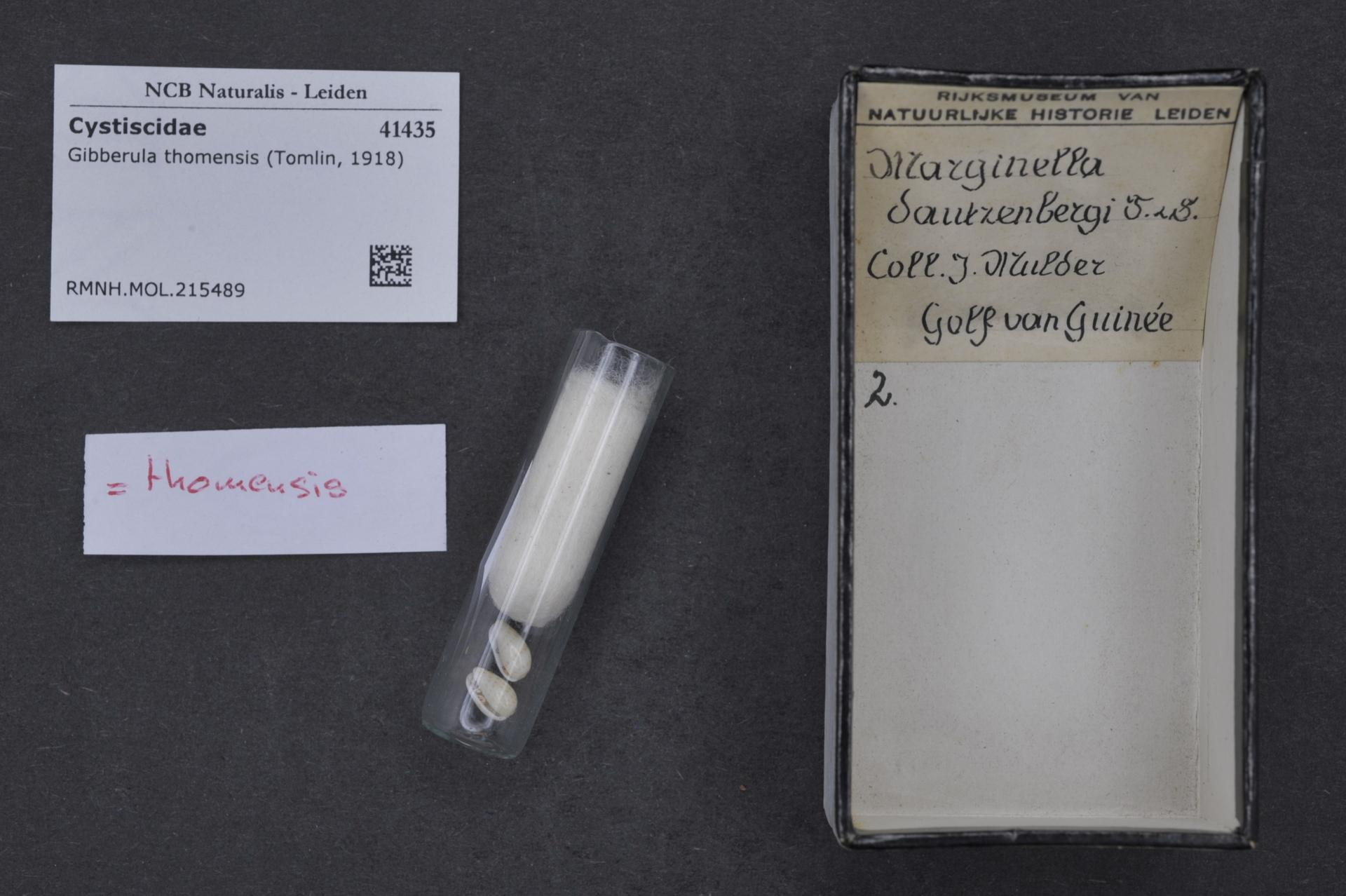

Scientific classification
- Kingdom: Animalia
- Phylum: Mollusca
- Class: Gastropoda
- Subclass: Caenogastropoda
- Order: Neogastropoda
- Family: Cystiscidae
- Subfamily: Cystiscinae
- Genus: Gibberula
- Species: G. thomensis

Binomial name
- Gibberula thomensis (Tomlin, 1919)

Synonyms
- Marginella thomensis Tomlin, 1919; Persicula thomensis (Tomlin, 1919)

= Gibberula thomensis =

Species of gastropod

Gibberula thomensis is a species of sea snail, a marine gastropod mollusk, in the family Cystiscidae.
