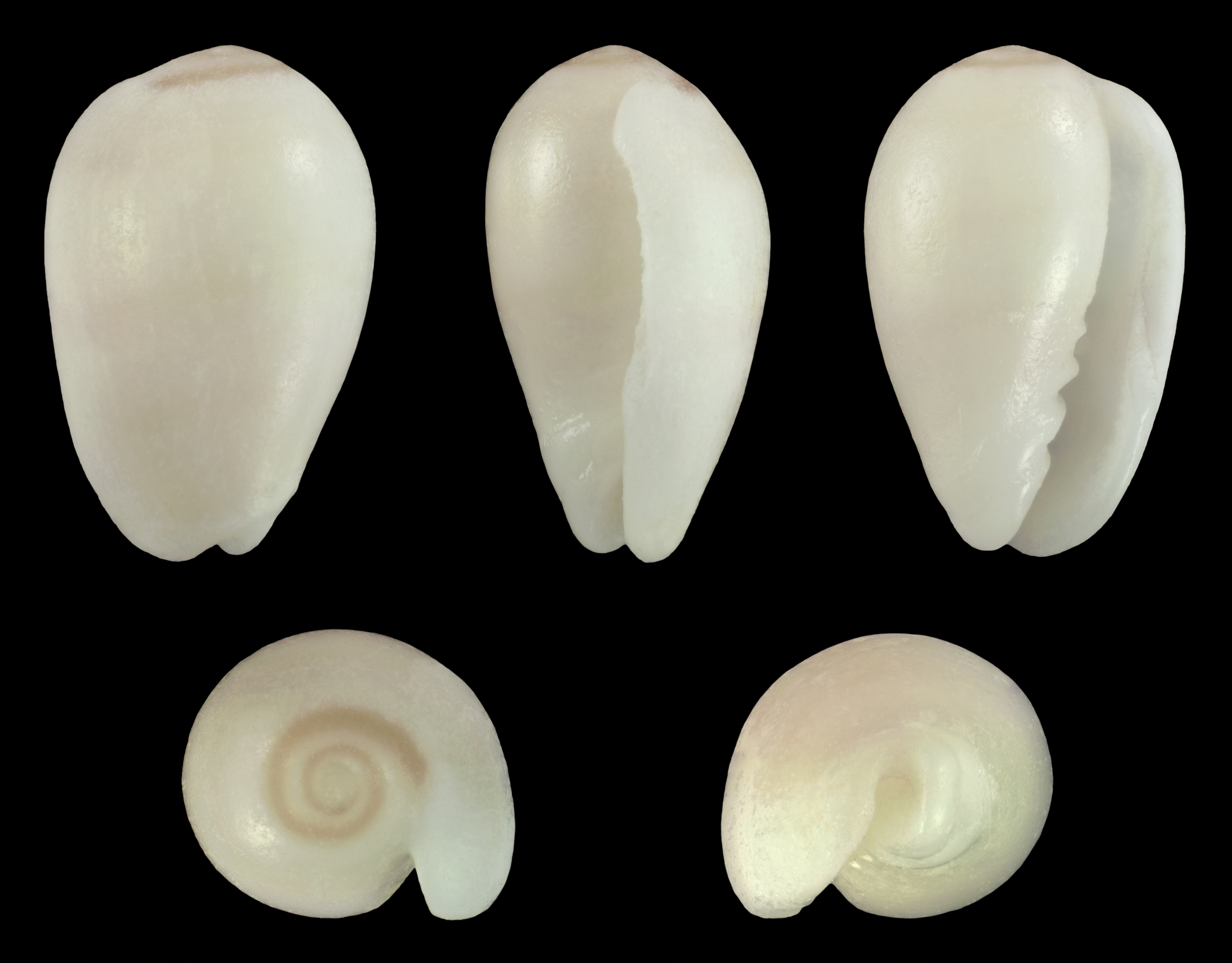
- Shell of Gibberula miliaria (white)
- Shell of Gibberula miliaria (yellow)

Scientific classification
- Kingdom: Animalia
- Phylum: Mollusca
- Class: Gastropoda
- Subclass: Caenogastropoda
- Order: Neogastropoda
- Family: Cystiscidae
- Subfamily: Cystiscinae
- Genus: Gibberula
- Species: G. miliaria

Binomial name
- Gibberula miliaria (Linnaeus, 1758)

Synonyms
- Conus siculus Delle Chiaje, 1828; Marginella majuscula Bucquoy, E.J., Ph. Dautzenberg & G.F. Dollfus, 1883; Marginella miliacea Lamarck, 1822; Marginella miliaria (Linnaeus, 1758); Marginella miliaria var. majuscula Bucquoy, Dautzenberg & Dollfus, 1883; Marginella miliaris [sic] (misspelling); Marginella oryza Doublier, 1853; Marginella zonata Swainson, W.A., 1840 (nomen dubium); Persicula miliaria (Linnaeus, 1758); Voluta miliaria Linnaeus, 1758 (original combination); Volvaria biplicata Risso, 1826; Volvaria miliacea Lamarck, 1822 (dubious synonym); Volvaria quadriplicata Risso, 1826; Volvaria septemplicata Risso, 1826; Volvaria sexplicata Risso, 1826

= Gibberula miliaria =

Species of gastropod

Gibberula miliaria is a species of very small sea snail, a marine gastropod mollusk or micromollusk in the family Cystiscidae.

== Description ==
The shell size varies between 4.5 mm and 7.5 mm

== Distribution ==
This species occurs in European waters (off Spain and Portugal), in the Mediterraneran Sea (offApulia and Greece) and in the Atlantic Ocean off the Canary Islands and Mauritania.
