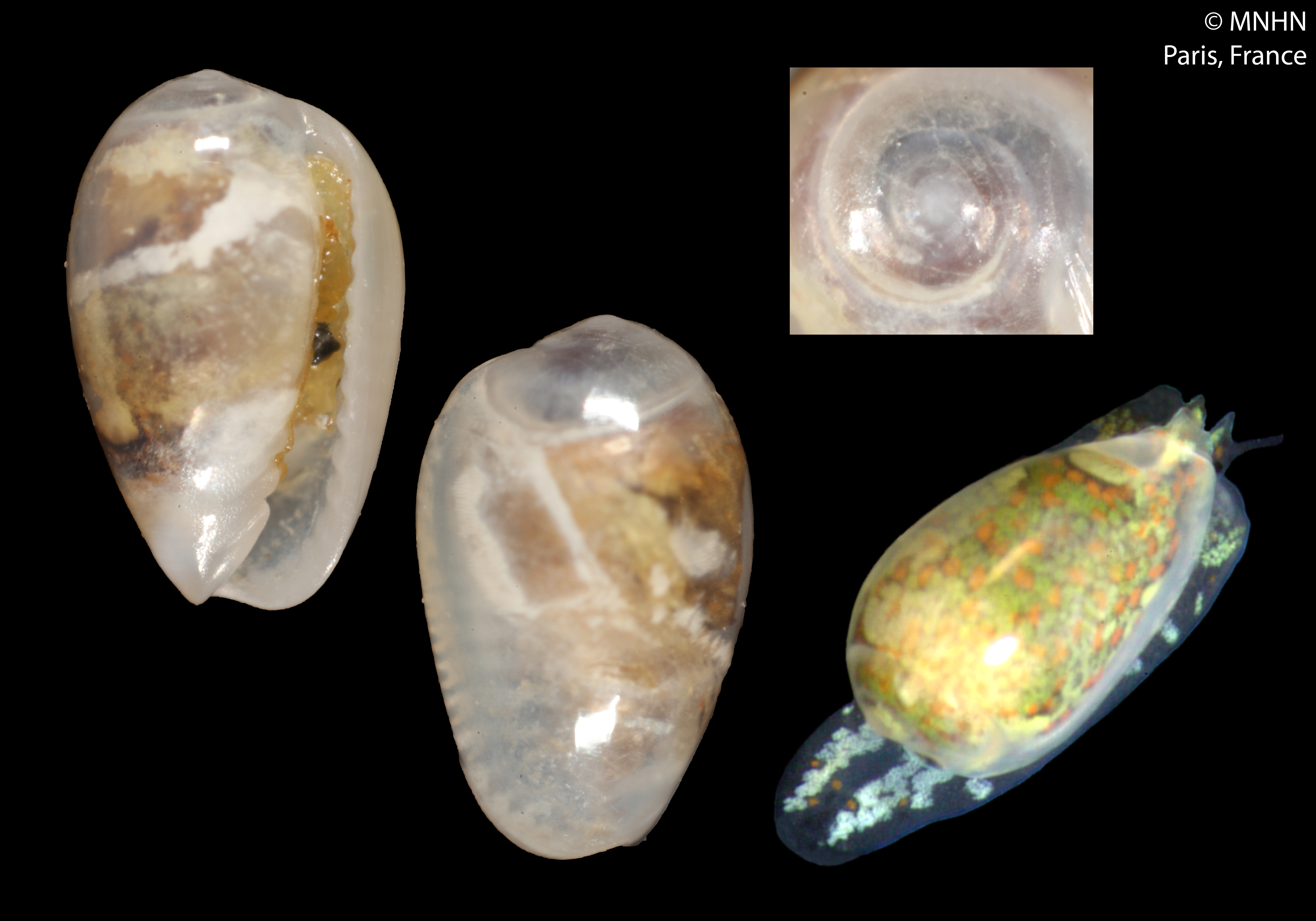
- Gibberula celerae

Scientific classification
- Kingdom: Animalia
- Phylum: Mollusca
- Class: Gastropoda
- Subclass: Caenogastropoda
- Order: Neogastropoda
- Family: Cystiscidae
- Subfamily: Persiculinae; Coovert & Coovert, 1995

= Persiculinae =

Subfamily of sea snails

Persiculinae is a taxonomic subfamily of minute to small predatory sea snails, marine gastropod mollusks. This subfamily includes several species which are micromollusks.

== Taxonomy ==
The subfamily is sometimes placed in the family Cystiscidae, and is sometimes instead left in the family Marginellidae the margin snails. It is within the clade Neogastropoda.

(Note: Gastropod taxonomy has been in flux for more than half a century, and this is especially true currently, because of new research in molecular phylogeny. Because of all the ongoing changes, different reliable sources can yield very different classifications.)

In 2019 this subfamily has been classified as a synonym of the subfamily Cystiscinae Stimpson, 1865

== Shell description ==
The shell minute to large, white, uniformly colored, or patterned; spire immersed or low to tall; lip thickened, smooth or lirate; external varix present or absent; siphonal notch present or absent; weak to distinct posterior notch present; columella multiplicate with combined total of 3 to 13 plications plus parietal lirae; internal whorls cystiscid type.

== Description of soft parts ==
Animal with short to long tentacles, rarely absent; siphon short to long; eyes situated laterally on head slightly below the base of the tentacles; mantle usually not extending over external shell surface.

== Internal anatomy ==
Odontophoral cartilages separate; valve of Leiblein present, with or without bypass tube; esophageal caecum absent; gland of Leiblein short, small, emptying directly into posterior end of esophagus; paired salivary glands ascinous or tubular, attached to esophagus just anterior to the valve of Leiblein, ducts attached to walls of esophagus; single accessory salivary gland present, ascinous or tubular, anal gland absent.

== Genera ==
- Persicula Schumacher, 1817
- Gibberula Swainson, 1840
- Canalispira Jousseaume, 1875
- Pachybathron Gaskoin, 1853

Genera brought into synonymy

- Baroginella Laseron, 1957: synonym of Canalispira Jousseaume, 1875
- Diluculum Barnard, 1962: synonym of Gibberula Swainson, 1840
- Epiginella Laseron, 1957: synonym of Gibberula Swainson, 1840
- Granula Jousseaume, 1875: synonym of Gibberula Swainson, 1840
- Kogomea Habe, 1951: synonym of Gibberula Swainson, 1840
- Microcassis Paulmier, 1997: synonym of Pachybathron Gaskoin, 1853
- Osvaldoginella Espinosa & Ortea, 1997: synonym of Canalispira Jousseaume, 1875
- Phyloginella Laseron, 1957: synonym of Gibberula Swainson, 1840

== Comparative shell anatomy of three genera within this subfamily ==
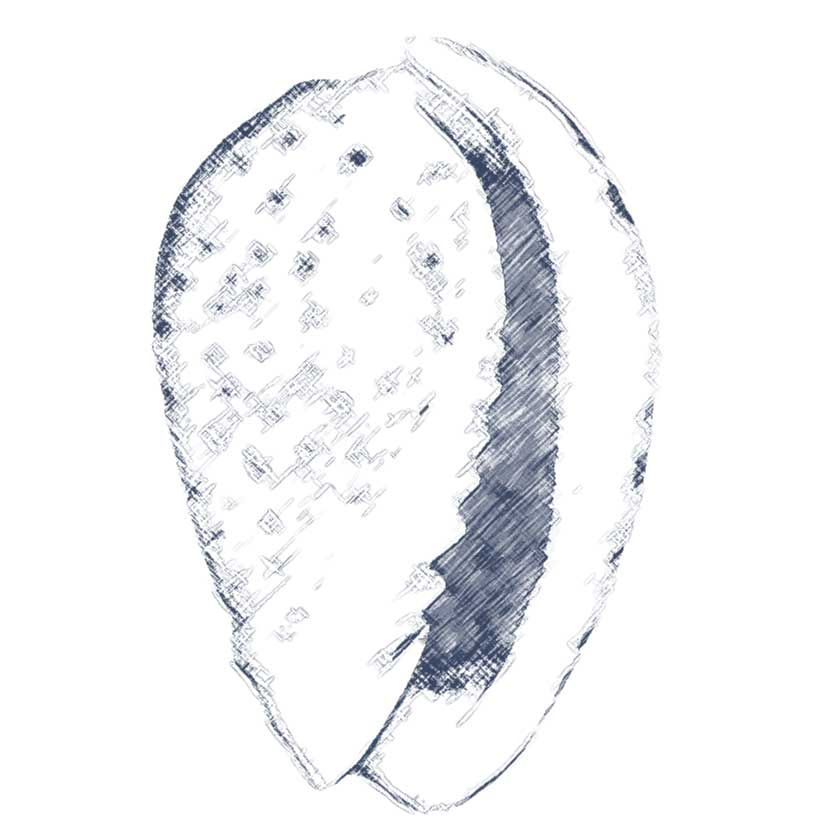
Persicula

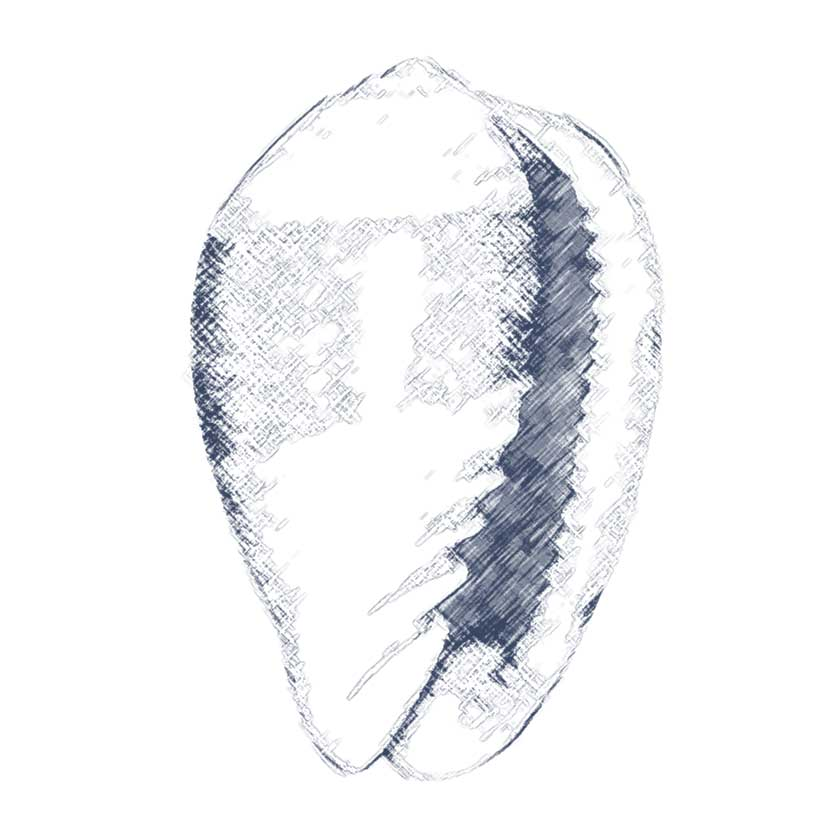
Gibberula

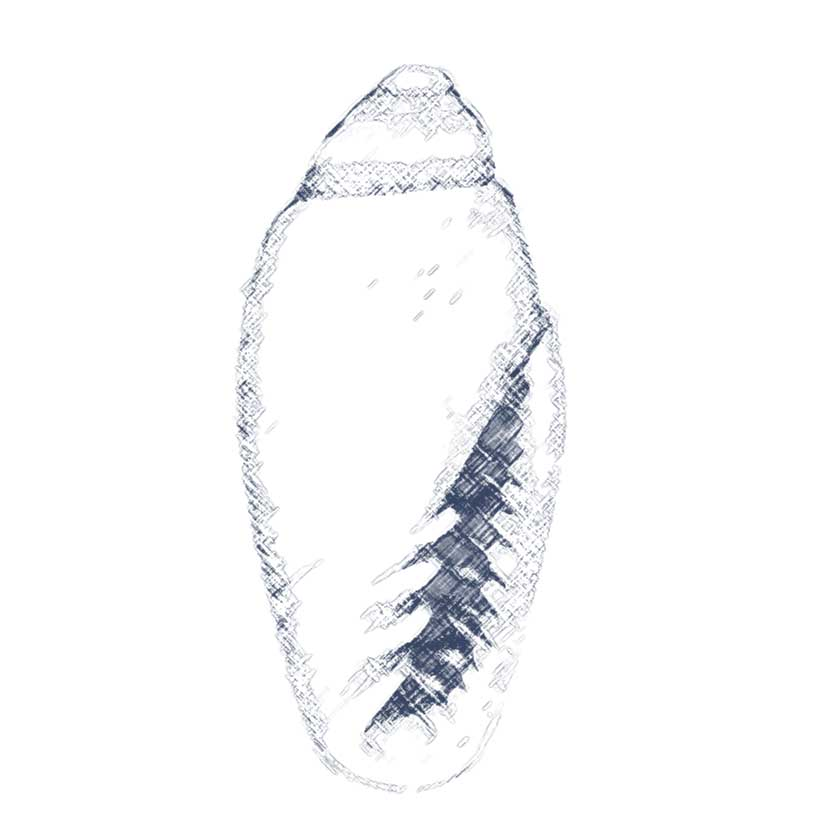
Canalispira
