= Redfield =

Redfield may refer to:

== People ==
- Redfield (surname)

== Places ==
United Kingdom

- Redfield, Bristol, an area within the City of Bristol

United States

- Mount Redfield, a mountain in Essex County, New York
- Redfield, Arkansas, a city in northwestern Jefferson County
- Redfield, Iowa, a city in Dallas County
- Redfield, Kansas, a city in Bourbon County
- Redfield, New York, a town in Oswego County
- Redfield, South Dakota, a city in and the county seat of Spink County
- Redfield, Texas, a census-designated place in Nacogdoches County
- Redfield School Historic District, a former school and historic district in Redfield, Arkansas
- Redfield Township, Spink County, South Dakota, a township in Spink County, South Dakota
- Redfield & West Streets Historic District, a street and historic district in New Haven, Connecticut

== Structures ==
- Redfield (Oak Level, Virginia), a house in Halifax County, Virginia, United States

== Science ==
- Redfield equation, Markovian master equation of a quantum system weakly coupled to its environment
- Redfield ratio, the atomic ratio of carbon, nitrogen and phosphorus found in phytoplankton and throughout the deep oceans
- Redfieldia, a monotypic genus in the grass family (Poaceae)

== Art and entertainment ==
- Redfield Records, an independent record label in Melle, Germany

== See also ==
- Redfield College (disambiguation)
- Justice Redfield (disambiguation)
