= Mount Emmons (New York) =

Mountain in New York, United States

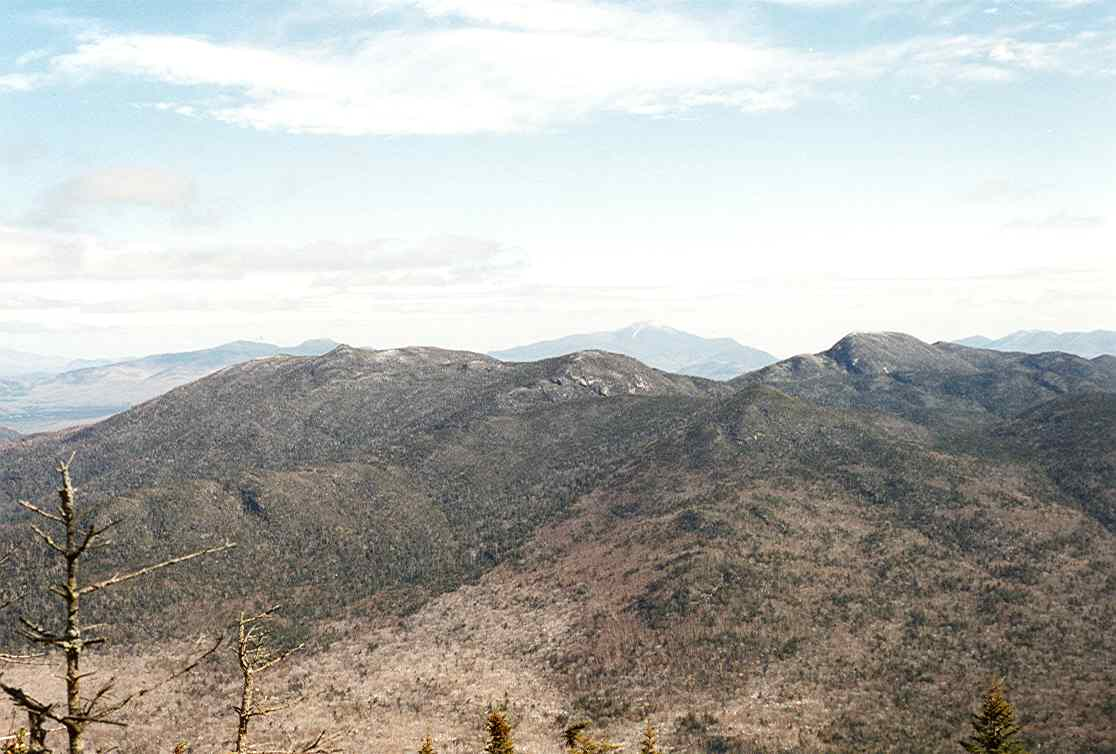
- Mount Emmons (left) seen from Seymour Mountain, March 1995

Highest point
- Elevation: 4,040 ft (1,230 m) NGVD 29
- Listing: Adirondack High Peaks 40th
- Coordinates: 44°08′37″N 74°12′51″W

Naming
- Etymology: Ebenezer Emmons

Geography
- Location within New York Location within the United States
- Location: Franklin County, New York, United States
- Parent range: Seward Mountains, Adirondack Mountains
- Topo map: USGS Ampersand Lake

Climbing
- First ascent: October 14, 1870, by Verplanck Colvin and Alvah Dunning

Mount Emmons is a mountain in the Seward Range of the Adirondack Mountains in the U.S. state of New York. It is the 40th-highest of the Adirondack High Peaks, with an elevation of 4,040 feet (1,230 m). The mountain is located in the town of Harrietstown in Franklin County. It is named for New York state geologist Ebenezer Emmons, who gave the mountains the popular name "Adirondacks", named at least five individual mountains, and made ascents of four during a survey of the region between 1837 and 1842. During the 19th century, the name "Mount Emmons" was bestowed upon a different mountain, today known as "Blue Mountain". Russell M. L. Carson proposed the name "Mount Emmons" be given to an unnamed peak south of Mount Seward in his 1927 book Peaks and People of the Adirondacks. The earliest recorded ascent was likely made on October 14, 1870, by surveyor Verplanck Colvin and trail guide Alvah Dunning during a hike to Mount Seward.

The summit of Emmons can be accessed on unmarked trails. The easiest access to the Seward Range is on the Ward Brook Truck Trail, which begins at a parking lot on Coreys Road south of the village of Saranac Lake. Between an intersection with a horse trail 4.7 miles (7.6 km) from the trailhead and the Ward Brook lean-to located 5.4 miles (8.7 km) from the trailhead, the trail crosses three brooks; the preferred route to Seward Mountain branches off from the trail at the first of these. An alternative route to the Seward Range follows the Calkins Brook Track Trail. This trail begins at the same parking lot and coincides with the Truck Trail for 1.2 miles (1.9 km) before diverging to the right. The unmarked trail to the Seward Range branches off the Calkins Brook Trail at 3.3 miles (5.3 km). Another unmarked trail connects the summits of Seward Mountain, Donaldson Mountain, and Mount Emmons (New York).

== See also ==
- List of mountains in New York
- Northeast 111 4,000-footers
- Adirondack High Peaks
- Adirondack Forty-Sixers
