= Marcy Group =

Subrange of the Adirondack Mountains in the U.S. state of New York

Coordinates: 44°7′N 73°55′W

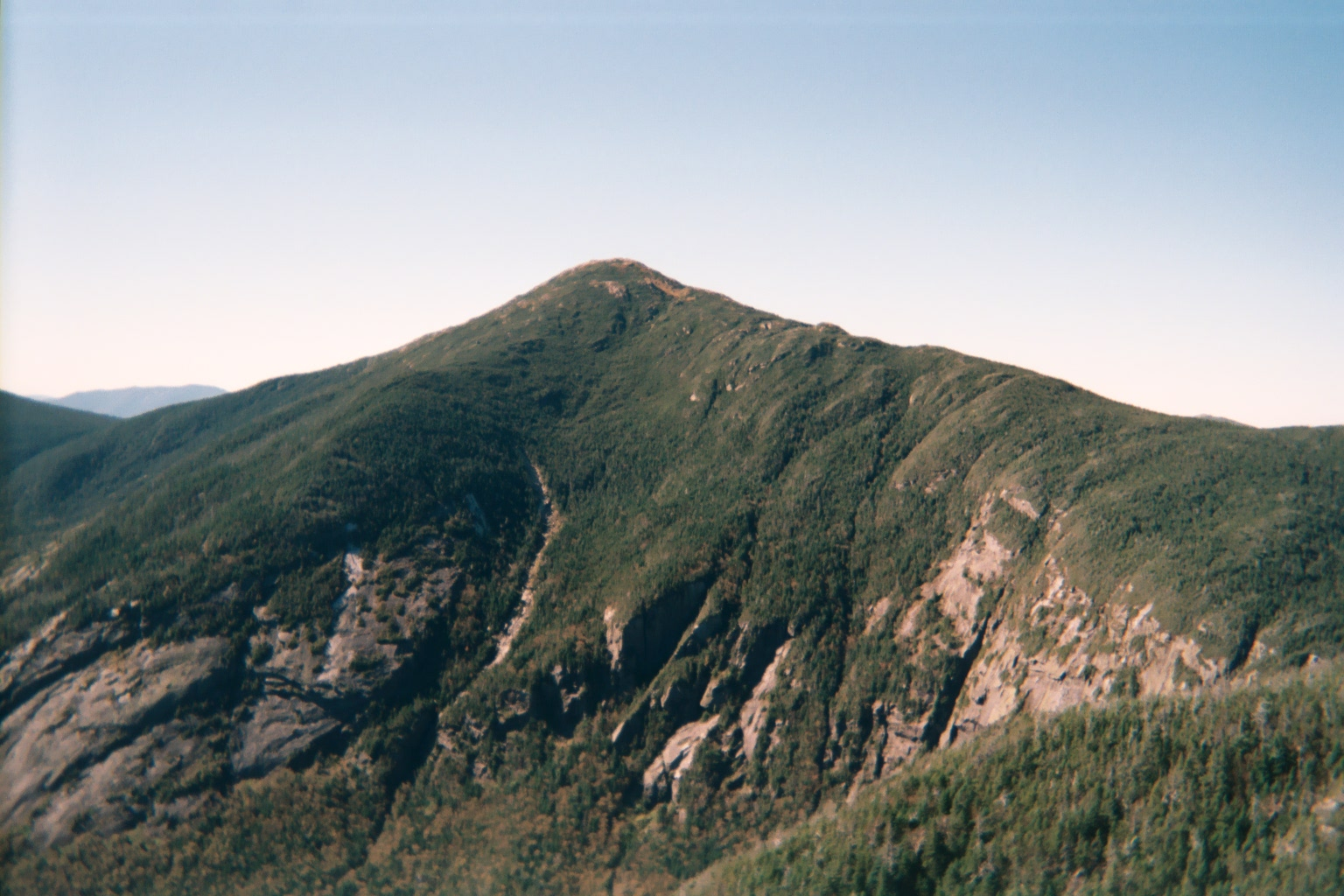
Mount Marcy seen from Mount Haystack

The Marcy Group, or Marcy Massif is a subset of the Great Range of the Adirondack Mountains, near Keene Valley, New York, United States. It consists of the High Peaks near Mount Marcy at the southern end of the Great Range, Allen Mountain, Cliff Mountain, Mount Colden, Gray Peak, Mount Haystack, Mount Redfield, and Mount Skylight, and the lesser peaks McDonnel Mountain, North River Mountains Peak, and Rist Mountain.

== Geology ==
The group is unique for its formation and composition of minerals, particularly for its composition of anorthosite rock. The Marcy massif includes two separate groups of plutons, an eastern and western range. The western range is situated near the St. Regis and Long Lake quadrangles and the eastern Marcy group is sited near Jay, Hurricane Mountain, and the town of North Hudson.
