= Redfield (surname) =

Redfield is a surname. Notable people with the name include:

- Alfred C. Redfield (1890–1983), American oceanographer
- Edward Willis Redfield (1869–1965), American painter
- Heman J. Redfield (1788–1877), American politician from New York
- J. Howard Redfield (1879–1944), American mathematician
- James Redfield (born 1950), American novelist
- James M. Redfield (born 1935), American classical scholar
- Joe Redfield (born 1961), American Major League Baseball third baseman
- John Howard Redfield (1815–1895), American botanist and conchologist
- LaVere Redfield (1897–1974), American millionaire and coin hoarder
- Liza Redfield (1924–2018), American conductor, pianist, and composer
- Luke Redfield (born 1983), American indie folk singer-songwriter
- Pam Redfield (born 1948), American politician from Nebraska
- Robert Redfield (1897–1958), American anthropologist
- Robert R. Redfield (born 1951), American virologist and medical researcher
- William Redfield (disambiguation), multiple people, including:
  - William C. Redfield (1858–1932), American politician, first U.S. Secretary of Commerce
  - William Charles Redfield (1789–1857), American meteorologist
  - William Redfield (actor) (1927–1976), American actor

== Fictional characters ==
- Chris and Claire Redfield, fictional characters from the Resident Evil survival horror series of video games

== See also ==
- Redfield (disambiguation)
