= Donaldson Mountain =

Mountain in New York, United States

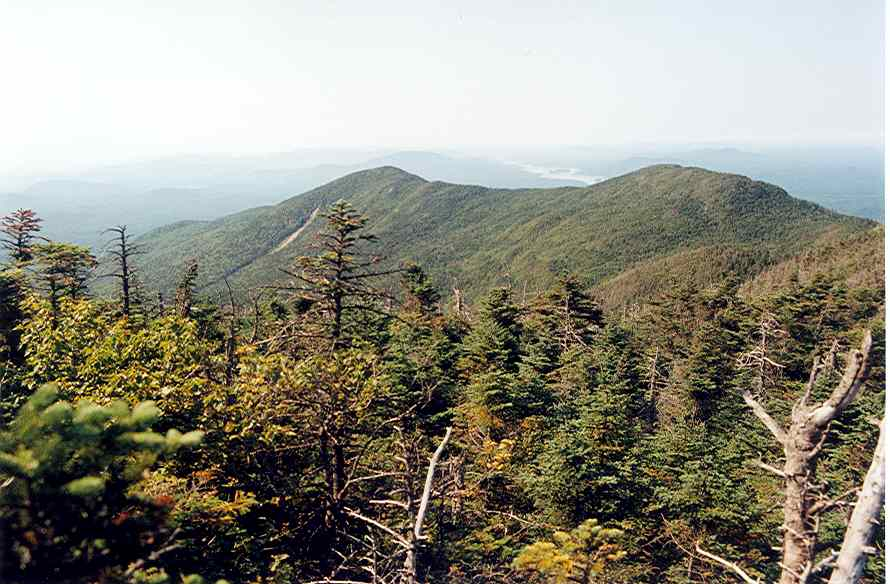
- Donaldson Mountain (Right) and Mount Emmons (Left) seen from Seward Mountain

Highest point
- Elevation: 4,140 ft (1,260 m) NGVD 29
- Listing: Adirondack High Peaks 33rd
- Coordinates: 44°09′14″N 74°12′40″W

Geography
- Location within New York Adirondack Park Location within the United States
- Location: Harrietstown, Franklin County, New York
- Parent range: Seward Mountains
- Topo map: USGS Ampersand Lake

Climbing
- First ascent: October 14, 1870, by Verplanck Colvin and Alvah Dunning
- Easiest route: Hike

Donaldson Mountain is a mountain in the Seward Range of the Adirondack Mountains in the U.S. state of New York. It is the 33rd-highest of the Adirondack High Peaks, with an elevation of 4,140 feet (1,260 m). The mountain is located in the town of Harrietstown in Franklin County. As the result of a writing campaign by the Adirondack Mountain Club and Russell M. L. Carson, it was named in 1924 for Alfred Lee Donaldson, author of A History of the Adirondacks, shortly after his death. Donaldson Mountain is flanked to the northeast by Seward Mountain, and to the south by Mount Emmons. The first recorded ascent of the mountain was made on October 14, 1870, by surveyor Verplanck Colvin and mountain guide Alvah Dunning, while they were hiking to Seward Mountain.

The summit of Donaldson can be accessed on unmarked trails. The easiest access to the Seward Range is on the Ward Brook Truck Trail, which begins at a parking lot on Coreys Road south of the village of Saranac Lake. Between an intersection with a horse trail 4.7 miles (7.6 km) from the trailhead and the Ward Brook lean-to located 5.4 miles (8.7 km) from the trailhead, the trail crosses three brooks; the preferred route to Seward Mountain branches off from the trail at the first of these. An alternative route to the Seward Range follows the Calkins Brook Track Trail. This trail begins at the same parking lot and coincides with the Truck Trail for 1.2 miles (1.9 km) before diverging to the right. The unmarked trail to the Seward Range branches off the Calkins Brook Trail at 3.3 miles (5.3 km). Another unmarked trail connects the summits of Seward Mountain, Donaldson Mountain, and Mount Emmons.

== See also ==
- List of mountains in New York
- Northeast 111 4,000-footers
- Adirondack High Peaks
- Adirondack Forty-Sixers
