= Seward Mountain (New York) =

Mountain in New York, United States

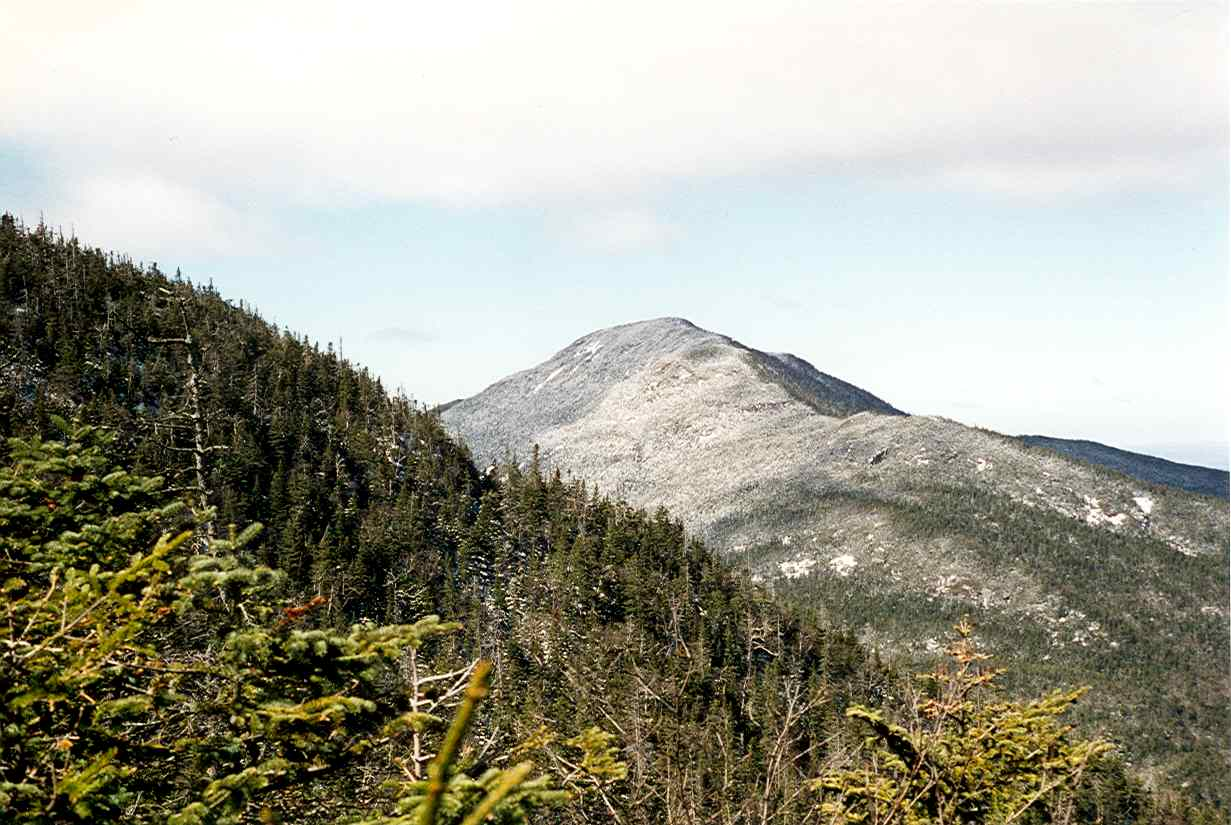
- Seward Mt. seen from Seymour Mt.

Highest point
- Elevation: 4,361 ft (1,329 m) NGVD 29
- Listing: Adirondack High Peaks 24th; New York County High Points 2nd
- Coordinates: 44°9.58′N 74°11.98′W

Geography
- Location within New York Adirondack Park Location within the United States
- Location: Harrietstown, Franklin County, New York
- Parent range: Seward Mountains
- Topo map: USGS Ampersand Lake

Climbing
- First ascent: October 15, 1870, by Verplanck Colvin, Alvah Dunning and Mitchell Sabattis (first recorded) (Note: Russell M. L. Carson records that Professor A. Guyot and Ernest Sandoz ascended either Seward Mountain or Seymour Mountain earlier in 1870, but it is not clear which.)

Seward Mountain is a mountain in the Seward Range of the Adirondacks in the U.S. state of New York. It is the 24th-highest of the Adirondack High Peaks, with an elevation of 4,361 feet (1,329 m). The mountain is located in the town of Harrietstown in Franklin County. It is named for New York governor William Seward.

== History ==
The mountain had the Mohawk name Ou-kor-lah, translated into English as "Great Eye", for a white spot on its side when viewed from Long Lake. The name Mount Seward was first used in print in a 1841 report to the New York State Legislature prepared by state geologist Ebenezer Emmons. The first recorded ascent of the mountain was made by surveyor Verplanck Colvin accompanied by mountain guides Alvah Dunning and Mitchell Sabattis on October 15, 1870.

== Ascent routes ==
The summit of Seward can be accessed on unmarked trails. The easiest access to the Seward Range is on the Ward Brook Truck Trail, which begins at a parking lot on Coreys Road south of the village of Saranac Lake. Between an intersection with a horse trail 4.7 miles (7.6 km) from the trailhead and the Ward Brook lean-to located 5.4 miles (8.7 km) from the trailhead, the trail crosses three brooks; the preferred route to Seward Mountain branches off from the trail at the first of these. An alternative route to the Seward Range follows the Calkins Brook Track Trail. This trail begins at the same parking lot and coincides with the Truck Trail for 1.2 miles (1.9 km) before diverging to the right. The unmarked trail to the Seward Range branches off of the Calkins Brook Trail at 3.3 miles (5.3 km). Another unmarked trail connects the summits of Seward Mountain, Donaldson Mountain, and Mount Emmons.

== Climate ==
Climate data for Seward Mountain 44.1603 N, 74.2017 W, Elevation: 4,029 ft (1,228 m) (1991–2020 normals)
Month	Jan	Feb	Mar	Apr	May	Jun	Jul	Aug	Sep	Oct	Nov	Dec	Year
Mean daily maximum °F (°C)	20.0 (−6.7)	22.2 (−5.4)	29.6 (−1.3)	44.3 (6.8)	56.9 (13.8)	65.3 (18.5)	69.3 (20.7)	68.0 (20.0)	62.4 (16.9)	49.7 (9.8)	35.2 (1.8)	25.5 (−3.6)	45.7 (7.6)
Daily mean °F (°C)	11.4 (−11.4)	13.2 (−10.4)	20.9 (−6.2)	34.3 (1.3)	47.0 (8.3)	56.1 (13.4)	60.5 (15.8)	59.2 (15.1)	53.0 (11.7)	40.9 (4.9)	28.0 (−2.2)	18.0 (−7.8)	36.9 (2.7)
Mean daily minimum °F (°C)	2.8 (−16.2)	4.2 (−15.4)	12.2 (−11.0)	24.2 (−4.3)	37.1 (2.8)	46.8 (8.2)	51.8 (11.0)	50.4 (10.2)	43.7 (6.5)	32.1 (0.1)	20.8 (−6.2)	10.5 (−11.9)	28.1 (−2.2)
Average precipitation inches (mm)	4.39 (112)	3.27 (83)	3.97 (101)	4.98 (126)	5.29 (134)	6.28 (160)	6.00 (152)	5.73 (146)	5.36 (136)	6.19 (157)	4.85 (123)	4.69 (119)	61 (1,549)
Source: PRISM Climate Group

== See also ==
- List of mountains in New York
- Northeast 111 4,000-footers
- Adirondack High Peaks
- Adirondack Forty-Sixers
