= Allen Mountain (New York) =

Mountain in New York, United States

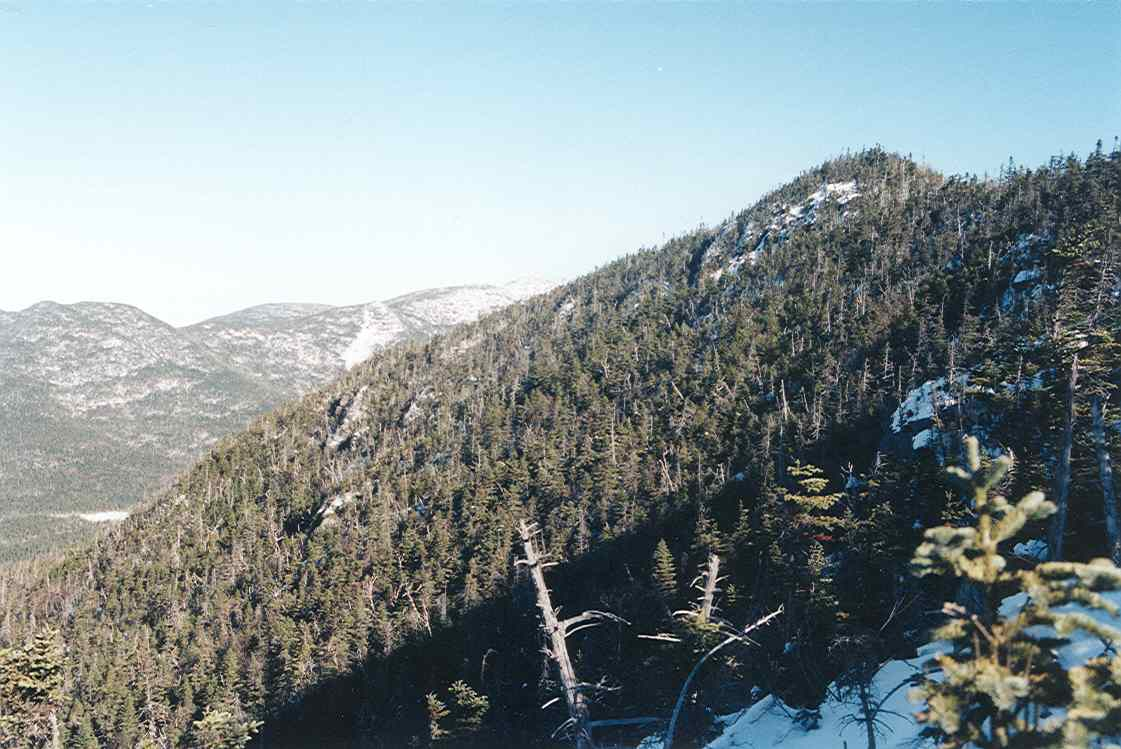
- Allen Mountain summit

Highest point
- Elevation: 4,340 ft (1,320 m) NGVD 29
- Listing: Adirondack High Peaks 26th
- Coordinates: 44°04′15″N 73°56′23″W

Geography
- Location within New York Adirondack Park Location within the United States
- Location: Keene / North Hudson, Essex County, New York
- Parent range: Marcy Group of the Great Range
- Topo map: USGS Mount Marcy

Climbing
- First ascent: August 19, 1921, by Bob Marshall, George Marshall, and Herbert Clark
- Easiest route: Hike

Allen Mountain is a mountain in the Adirondacks in the U.S. state of New York. It is the 26th-highest of the Adirondack High Peaks, with an elevation of 4,340 feet (1,320 m). The mountain is located in the town of Keene in Essex County. It was named for Rev. William B. Allen by his friend, Rev. Joseph Twichell, while the two were visiting the Adirondacks in 1869. The earliest recorded ascent of the mountain was made on August 21, 1921, by Bob Marshall, George Marshall, and Herbert Clark.

An unmarked trail to the summit of Allen Mountain can be reached from the Upper Works located off New York State Route 28N. The Hanging Spear Falls Trail, also known as the East River Trail, begins at a parking lot near an abandoned stone furnace from the village of Tahawus. A herd path to Allen Mountain turns off this trail 5.1 miles (8.2 km) from the trailhead. An alternative approach on old lumber roads that intersect the Hanging Spear Falls Trail was possible prior to 2020, but is no longer recommended, as the roads have been "renaturalized" by the New York State Department of Environmental Conservation.

The Adirondack Mountain Club discourages approaching Allen from the Elk Lake-Marcy Trail or from nearby Mount Skylight, which would involve passing through areas of blowdown and thick second-growth forest, and recommends to allow at least four hours from the marked trail to the summit.

== See also ==
- List of mountains of New York
- Northeast 111 4,000-footers
- Adirondack High Peaks
- Adirondack Forty-Sixers
