= Kifle Wahid =

Kifle Wahid (Ge'ez: ክፍለ ዋሕድ, romanized: Kǝflä Wahǝd); born c. 1560s – died 1618) was an Ethiopian nobleman who governed much of Tigray in the late 16th and early 17th centuries. He played an important political role during the reigns of emperors Sarsa Dengel, Yaqob and Susenyos I, and at the height of his power extended his authority towards the Red Sea coast.

== Early life and family ==
Kéflä Wahéd was born around the 1560s. He was the son of šum ʿAgamä Däbrä Séyon Azäzäy, from Kéhät near Adigrat. He inherited his father's governorship of Agame and later expanded his rule over extensive areas of Tigray.

Around the 1580s, Emperor Sarsa Dengel arranged his marriage to his daughter Kréstosawit, also remembered in oral tradition under the names Késésayit or Sésayit. Through his wife, Kéflä Wahéd controlled numerous gult estates in Tigray, including lands in Enticho and Dibdibo, as well as territories extending towards Begemder.

== Political career ==
Following the death of Sarsa Dengel in 1597, Kéflä Wahéd supported the faction that successfully placed the emperor's young son Yaqob on the throne. Yaqob's accession allowed him briefly to occupy a central position in the imperial government. Together with Ras Atnatewos, he exercised considerable influence over the interim administration. Kéflä Wahéd soon returned to Tigray to reassume its governorship, while Atnatewos became the young emperor's tutor.

Kéflä Wahéd subsequently extended his authority towards the Red Sea coast and assumed the titles of tégre makwännén and néguśä bahér, the latter corresponding to the office of Bahr Negus. In 1603 his seat was at Debarwa in Hamasen, the capital of the Bahr Negus, where he received the Jesuit missionary Pedro Páez.

The powerful nobleman Sébhat Lä'ab of Hamassien was in Kéflä Wahéd's service and was ordered by him to detain ras Zäśéllase, the rebellious commander of the Qwérban regiment. Kéflä Wahéd later appointed Zämaryam of Tämben as governor of the Bahr Negus's territory in Debarwa and married his daughter Amätä Séyon to him.

== Conflict with Susenyos I ==
During the renewed dynastic struggles of the early 17th century, Kéflä Wahéd remained loyal to Emperor Yaqob. On 12 April 1606, he intervened with troops from Tigray in the battle of Cäcäho in Begemder between Yaqob and the future emperor Susenyos I. Kéflä Wahéd was defeated and fled back to Tigray.

After Susenyos's accession, Kéflä Wahéd submitted to the new emperor and sent him valuable gifts. Susenyos formally pardoned him, and other governors between Hamasen and Baqla subsequently followed his example. Nevertheless, around 1608 Kéflä Wahéd was removed from the governorship of Tigray and replaced by Susenyos's half-brother, ras Séʾélä Kréstos.

Kéflä Wahéd died of plague in 1618 at the emperor's camp at Gorgora.

== Descendants ==
Kéflä Wahéd's descendants retained a number of practical and symbolic privileges until 1974. His family's gult estates gradually developed into hereditary rist property.

According to the traditions recorded by Smidt, Kéflä Wahéd had three sons and three daughters, who received six estates. Bakimos received Wadéb; Amätä Séyon received ʿAddi Qälqäl; Wälättä Déngél received Wäʿaga; Zäwäldämaryam received Dagga; Yéhannés received ʿAddi Krés (Débdébo); and Wälättä Hawaryat received Éséhél. In some traditions, Yéhannés is replaced in the genealogy by Bakimos's son Arqanos.

One line of Kéflä Wahéd's descendants was also known in what is now Eritrea, including at ʿAdégna in Éggäla. His son Bakimos of Agame, who through his mother was a grandson of Emperor Sarsa Dengel, appears in historical sources as an opponent of Catholicism and a defender of the Orthodox faith.

The office of šum ʿAgamä was later transferred to another family line, which was likewise said to descend from Däbrä Séyon and was associated with šum ʿAgamä Säbagadis.

== Legacy and oral traditions ==
Kéflä Wahéd occupies an important place in Tigrayan oral historiography. He is remembered as the founder of Adigrat, and the church of Cärqos there is traditionally attributed to him. He is also regarded as an ancestor of several prominent Tigrayan families, both Christian and Muslim, which claim Solomonic descent through his wife Kréstosawit, a daughter of Sarsa Dengel.

Kréstosawit's grave was traditionally shown at the monastery of Énda Maryam Wéhabit, near Débdébo in Mägarya Sämri, where she was said to have lived after becoming a widow. According to oral tradition, her grandmother belonged to the Däqqi Bortukan and was said to have come from Portugal.

Kéflä Wahéd also appears in Tigrayan legends. His mother was said to have been a zarti, one of the female earth spirits known as däqqi hédértäna, and Kéflä Wahéd himself was believed to have eventually been "taken back" by them.

A later dynastic connection may also have preserved his family's importance. Smidt suggests that Emperor Iyoas I's construction of a church at Sägli in the mid-18th century, another estate associated with Kréstosawit, was probably connected with the emperor's genealogical relationship to Kéflä Wahéd's descendants.
