= Big Slide Mountain =

Big Slide Mountain can refer to several mountains:

Name	USGS link	State	County	USGS map	Coordinates	Elevation	
Big Slide Mountain		New York	Essex	Keene Valley	44°10′56″N 073°52′14″W	4,199 ft	1,280 m
Big Slide Mountain		Oregon	Marion	Bull of the Woods	44°53′31″N 122°04′16″W	5,485 ft	1,672 m
The Big Slide		Montana	Carbon	The Big Slide	45°16′20″N 109°05′32″W	5,102 ft	1,555 m
