= Wrist (disambiguation) =

The wrist is the joint connecting the hand with the forearm.

Wrist may also refer to:

- "Wrist" (Chris Brown song), a 2015 song
- "Wrist" (Logic song), a 2016 single
- Wrist, Germany, a municipality in Schleswig-Holstein

== See also ==
- Rist
