= Seymour Mountain =

Mountain in the United States

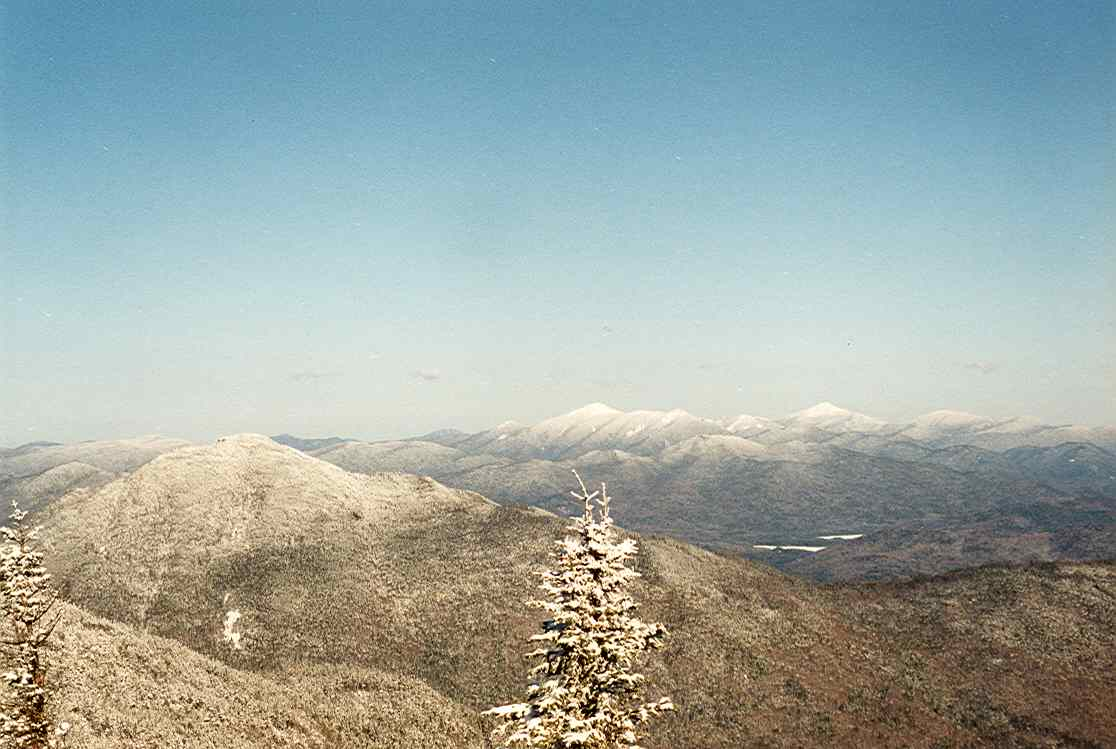
- Seymour Mt. (L) seen from Donaldson Mt.

Highest point
- Elevation: 4,120 ft (1,260 m) NGVD 29
- Listing: Adirondack High Peaks 34th
- Coordinates: 44°9.49′N 74°10.36′W

Geography
- Location within New York Adirondack Park Location within the United States
- Location: Harrietstown, Franklin County, New York
- Parent range: Seward Mountains
- Topo map: USGS Ampersand Lake

Climbing
- First ascent: October 1, 1872, by Verplanck Colvin, Dave Hunter, and Hank Parker (first recorded) (Note: Russell M. L. Carson records that Professor A. Guyot and Ernest Sandoz ascended either Seward Mountain or Seymour Mountain in 1870, but it is not clear which.)
- Easiest route: Hike

Seymour Mountain is a mountain in the Seward Range of the Adirondacks in the U.S. state of New York. It is the 34th-highest of the Adirondack High Peaks, with an elevation of 4,120 feet (1,260 m). The mountain is located in the town of Harrietstown in Franklin County, directly east of Seward Mountain. Surveyor Verplanck Colvin assigned the name "Ragged Mountain" to the peak in 1873, but it was later renamed for New York governor Horatio Seymour. The earliest recorded ascent was made on October 1, 1872, by Colvin and trail guides Dave Hunter and Hank Parker.

The summit of Seymour can be accessed on unmarked trails. The easiest access to the Seward Range is on the Ward Brook Truck Trail, which begins at a parking lot on Coreys Road south of the village of Saranac Lake. This trail passes the Ward Brook lean-to after 5.4 miles (8.7 km). An unmarked trail to the summit of Seymour branches off from the Truck Trail at a brook approximately 0.1 miles (0.16 km) past the lean-to. This path runs parallel to an old slide track and becomes very steep before leveling out for the remainder of the distance to the peak.

== See also ==
- List of mountains in New York
- Northeast 111 4,000-footers
- Adirondack High Peaks
- Adirondack Forty-Sixers
