= Mitchell Sabattis =

Adirondack pioneer and guide (c. 1821–1906)

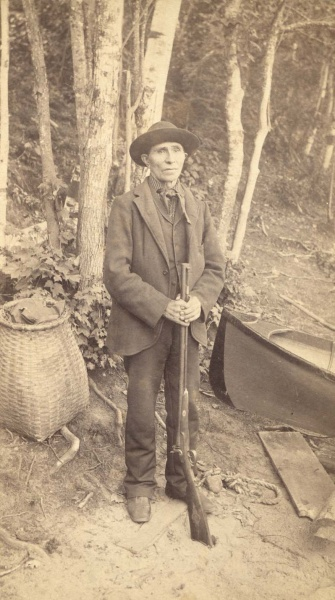
Sabattis photographed circa 1855 with a pack basket and guideboat

Mitchell (Note: Alternately spelled "Mitchel" based on the French "Michel".) Sabattis (c. 1821 (Note: Sources give varying dates for Sabattis's birth. Hamilton County historians Ted Aber and Stella King place it at 1824; anthropologist Christopher Roy and genealogist Daniel Benedict place it at 1821; Melissa Otis gives dates of 1821 and 1823. Alfred L. Donaldson gives an outlier birth date of 1801 in his History of the Adirondacks.) – April 16, 1906) was an Abenaki pioneer and guide in the Adirondack Mountains. He gained prominence as a guide for many well-to-do visitors to the Adirondacks as the mountains became a popular vacation destination in the late 19th century and was credited with the invention of the Adirondack guideboat. He was the first permanent settler of Long Lake, New York, and held various elected offices in the town as it grew. After his death, Sabattis was remembered by numerous place names in the Long Lake area, including a mountain, recreation area, Boy Scout camp, and railway station and associated hamlet.

== Early life ==
Sabattis was born c. 1821 in Parishville, New York. Some records indicate he was baptized Michel Saint-Baptiste (later simplified to "Sabattis") at the Akwesasne Catholic mission. A full-blooded Abenaki, his father, Peter Sabattis (also known as Jean-Baptiste Saint-Denys), had been a scout for American troops during the American Revolutionary War and the War of 1812. Mitchell later said that his first visit to Long Lake took place as a boy, and he became its first permanent settler.

Sabattis married Elizabeth "Betsey" Dornburgh, a fellow early Long Lake settler, c. 1845. They had at least 11 children, of whom eight reached adulthood. Three of their sons followed their father's trade as guides, and one became a guideboat builder as well.

Sabattis struggled with alcoholism during his early adulthood but gave up drinking abruptly. According to a published reminiscence one of his guiding clients, Lucius E. Chittenden, intervened in 1850. With foreclosure impending on Sabattis's home in nearby Newcomb, Chittenden offered to assume the mortgage, provided Sabattis gave up drinking. Going completely sober, Sabattis had a very productive winter hunting season and later visited Chittenden at his home in Vermont bringing sufficient game to pay off the mortgage. To extend his hold over Sabattis's sobriety, Chittenden extended further credit for Sabattis to expand his house to keep boarders during the summer. By the following summer, Sabattis had remained sober. Sabattis continued to live in Newcomb into the 1860s but returned to Long Lake by 1870.

== Adirondack guide ==
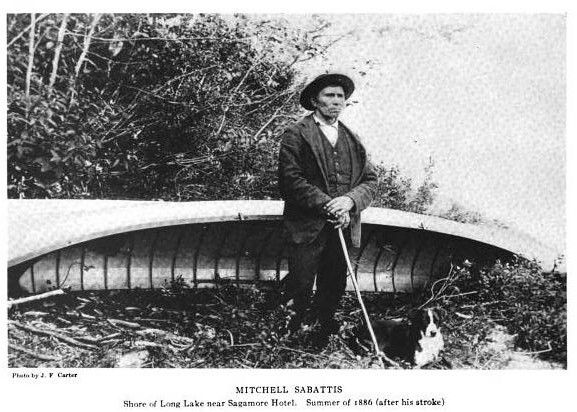
Sabattis photographed alongside a guideboat later in life

In his time, Sabattis was considered unexcelled as a guide and woodsman. Despite his short stature and build, he had "exceptional strength and endurance." He was mentioned frequently in newspaper and book accounts of Adirondack adventures, appearing in the Spirit of the Times, a popular sporting newspaper, as early as 1849. Sabattis was recommended as a guide by William H. "Adirondack" Murray in his writings recommending Adirondack travel. In addition to Chittenden, his notable clients included Joel T. Headley, Benson John Lossing, and Charles Wilkins Webber. He guided Verplanck Colvin on some of his Adirondack surveys, including the first recorded ascent of Seward Mountain. The Sabattises also hosted George W. "Nessmuk" Sears at their Long Lake boardinghouse.

Sabattis emphasized responsible stewardship of game on the part of his clients; one account from the 1850s describes Sabattis and other guides leaving behind a so-called "sport" who broke a promise not to shoot excessive quantities of deer and leave their remains to rot. As a devout Wesleyan, when guiding, Sabattis was known to admonish his clients not to fish on the Sabbath.

Alongside Cyrus Palmer, he was credited by Alfred L. Donaldson, an early 20th-century historian of the Adirondacks, with assembling the Adirondack guideboat, a light rowed craft carrying a guide and two passengers and that could be carried by a single guide at portages.

== Civic leadership and later life ==
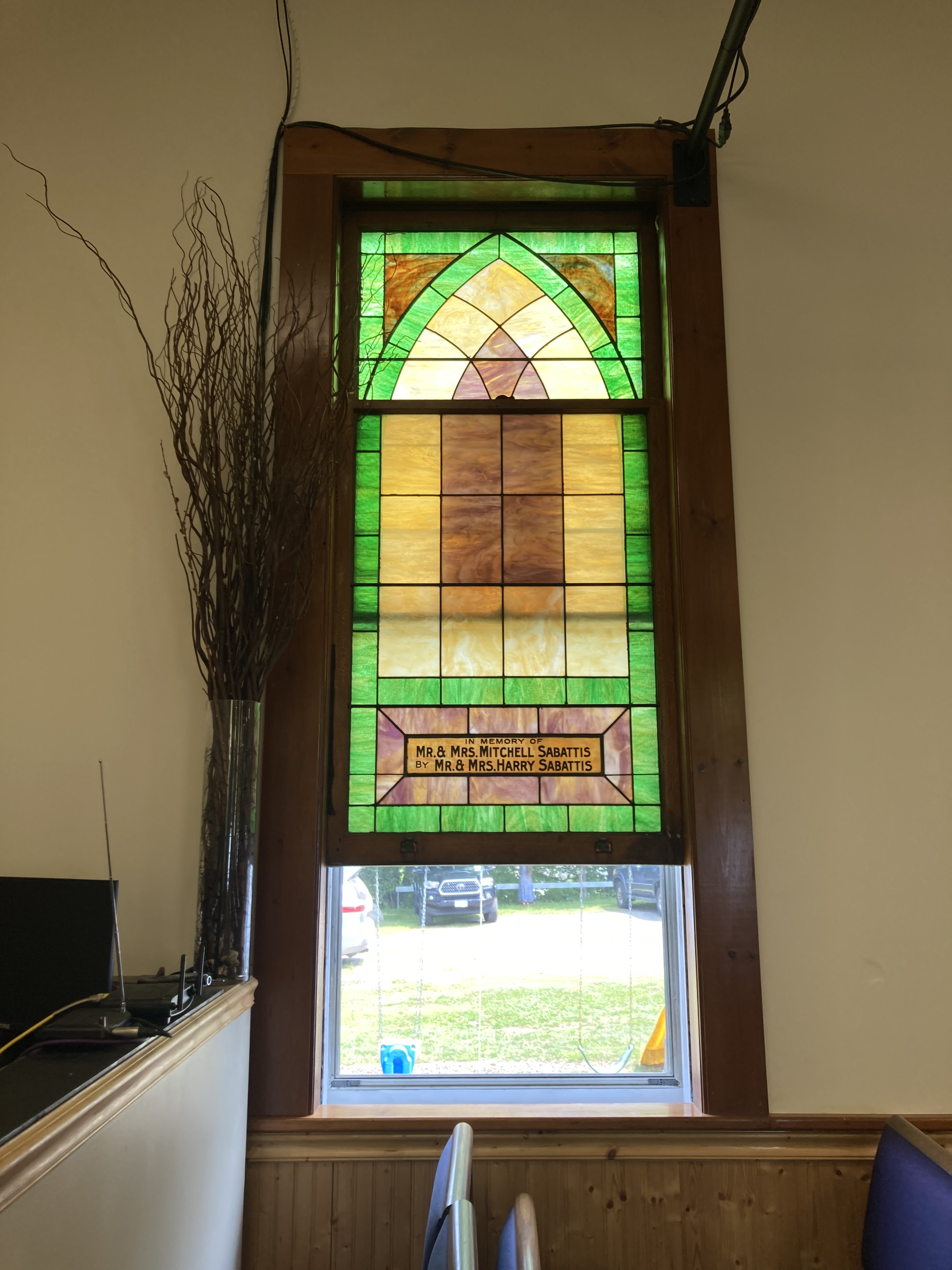
A memorial stained glass window honors Mitchell and Betsey Sabattis at the Long Lake Wesleyan Church.

Sabattis was a lifelong member of the Wesleyan Methodist church in Long Lake. In 1865, when the congregation began raising funds to build their first church, Sabattis called on well-known ministers from Boston, New York and Philadelphia whom he had guided on their vacations. They invited him to speak to their congregations, and he returned with $2,000 for the church's construction. Although he was not ordained, Sabattis often preached in the church and was known in his youth for his violin playing. Sabattis was elected commissioner of highways in Long Lake in 1866 and held other local offices throughout his life. Betsey Sabattis died in 1901. Mitchell continued working as a guide until his death in Long Lake in 1906.

== Legacy ==
A fluent Abenaki speaker, Sabattis was a source for linguist John Dyneley Prince's research on the Native American sources of Adirondack names.

Those who encountered Sabattis stressed his honesty and devotion and a sense of general admiration. According to Melissa Otis, he was recognized as being one of the top three or four hunters and guides in Adirondack history. A pistol given to Sabattis and engraved by some of his clients in 1867 was acquired for the collection of the Adirondack Experience in 2021.

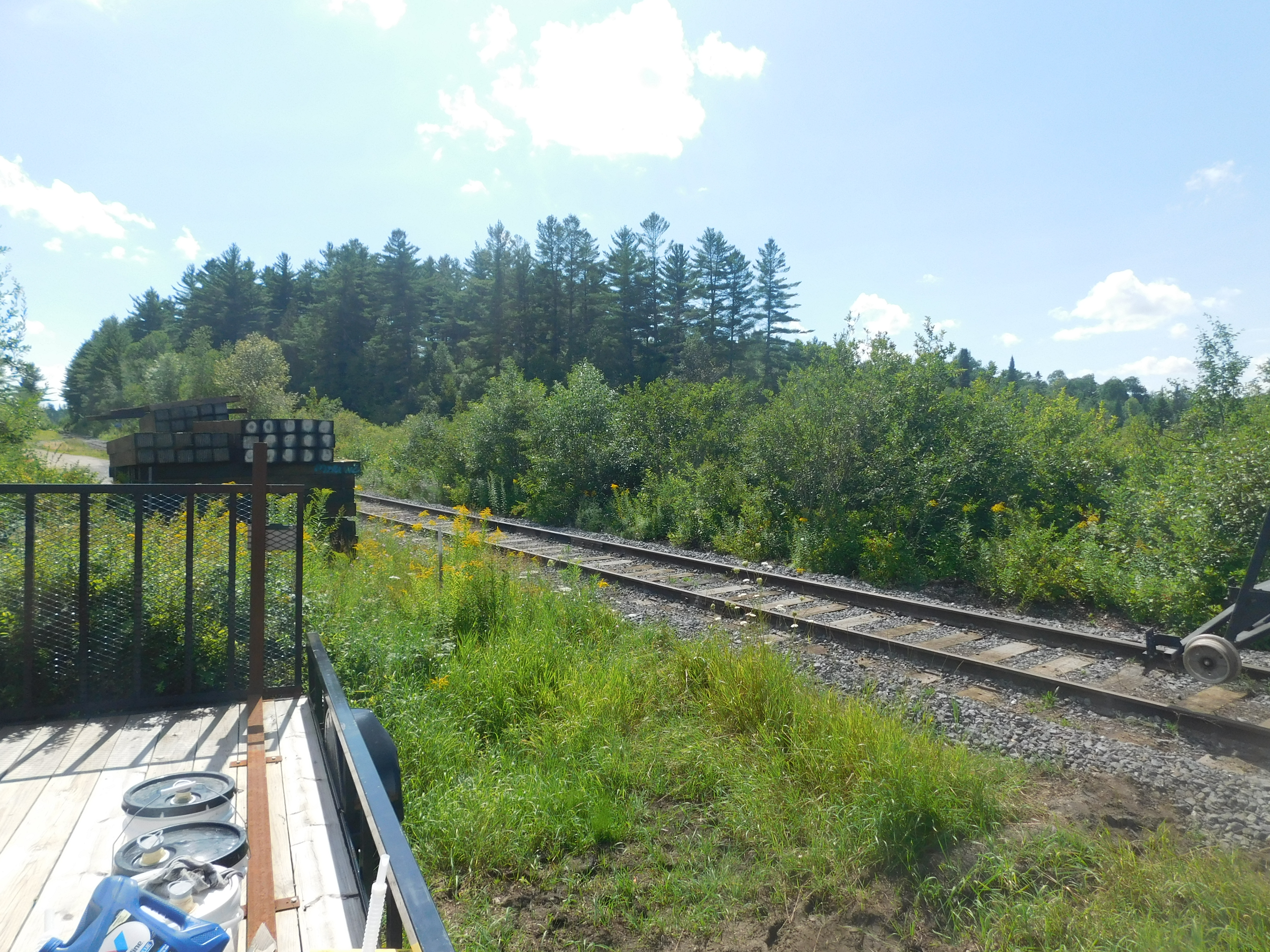
Reconstruction on Sabattis Station in 2022 for the Adirondack Railroad

Sabattis is memorialized in several place names around Long Lake, including the hamlet around the railroad station west of Long Lake, the Sabattis Scout Reservation, Mount Sabattis, and the nearby Mount Sabattis Recreation Area.
