= Rist =

Rist is a surname. Notable people with the surname include:

- Boy Rist (1912–1972), Norwegian officer and WWII resistance fighter
- Charles Rist (1874–1955), French economist
- Gilbert Rist (1938–2023), Swiss academic
- Edwin Rist, American flautist and fly-tyer
- Johann Rist (1607–1667), German dramatist and poet
- John Rist (born 1936), British scholar of ancient philosophy and classics
- Léonard Rist (1905–1982), French economist and banker; first chief economist of the World Bank
- Liisi Rist (born 1991), Estonian racing cyclist
- Pipilotti Rist (born 1962), Swiss visual artist
- Robbie Rist (born 1964), American actor
- José Antonio Kast Rist (born 1966), Chilean politician and current president.
- Will Rist (born 1987), English cricketer

== See also ==
- RIST is an acronym for the Reynolds Intellectual Screening Test.
- Rist Mountain is part of the Marcy Group in the Adirondack Mountains
- Reliable Internet Stream Transport - A video streaming protocol
- Wrist
