= Cascade Mountain (New York) =

Mountain in New York, US

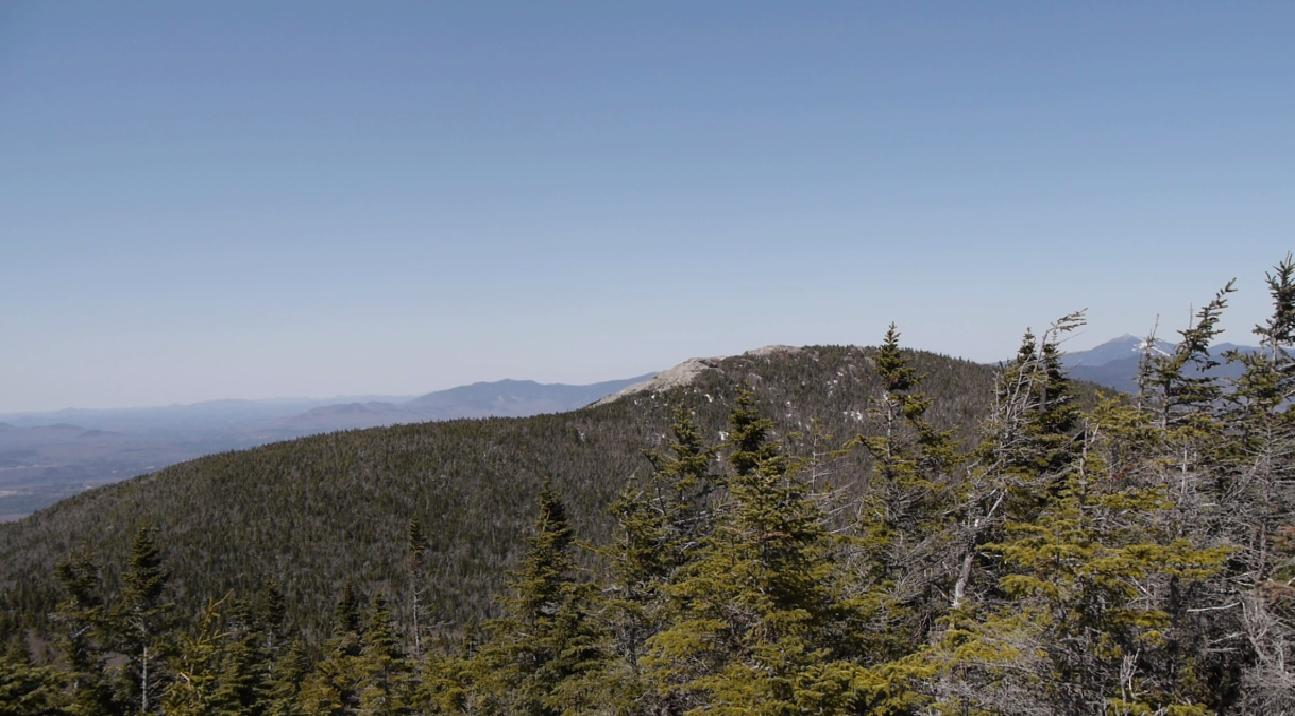
- Cascade Mountain, from Porter Mountain

Highest point
- Elevation: 4,098 ft (1,249 m) NGVD 29
- Listing: Adirondack High Peaks 36th
- Coordinates: 44°13′07″N 73°51′38″W

Geography
- Location within New York Adirondack Park Location within the United States
- Location: Keene, New York, U.S.
- Parent range: Adirondacks
- Topo map: USGS Keene Valley

Climbing
- First ascent: 1872, by Lon Pierce (first recorded)
- Easiest route: Hike

Cascade Mountain is a mountain in the Adirondacks in the U.S. state of New York. It is the 36th-highest of the Adirondack High Peaks, with an elevation of 4,098 feet (1,249 m). The mountain is located in the town of Keene in Essex County. Prior to 1860, the mountain was named "Long Pond Mountain" for a pond located at its base. Long Pond was divided by a landslide shortly after 1860, and the divided ponds were named "Edmund's Ponds" until 1878, when Sidney and Warren Weston built a hotel in between the two ponds. They renamed the ponds the "Cascade Lakes", after a waterfall flowing down the mountain in the path of the landslide, and Long Pond Mountain was renamed to Cascade Mountain. The earliest recorded ascent was made in 1872 by a trapper named Lon Pierce.

A trail to the summit of Cascade Mountain begins on New York State Route 73, 6.8 miles (10.9 km) from the center of Keene and 4.5 miles (7.2 km) from the Adirondak Loj road. The trail continues 2.4 miles (3.9 km) and ascends 1,940 feet (590 m) to the bare rocky peak, which offers views of many other High Peaks and the Champlain Valley. Cascade is one of the most popular hikes in the Adirondacks, and regularly faces issues with overcrowding at the summit and overflowing parking, which motivated a decision to replace the existing trail with a longer, 4.3 miles (6.9 km) trail, beginning at the Mount Van Hoevenberg trailhead. As of 2025, the new trail remains under construction.

== Gallery ==
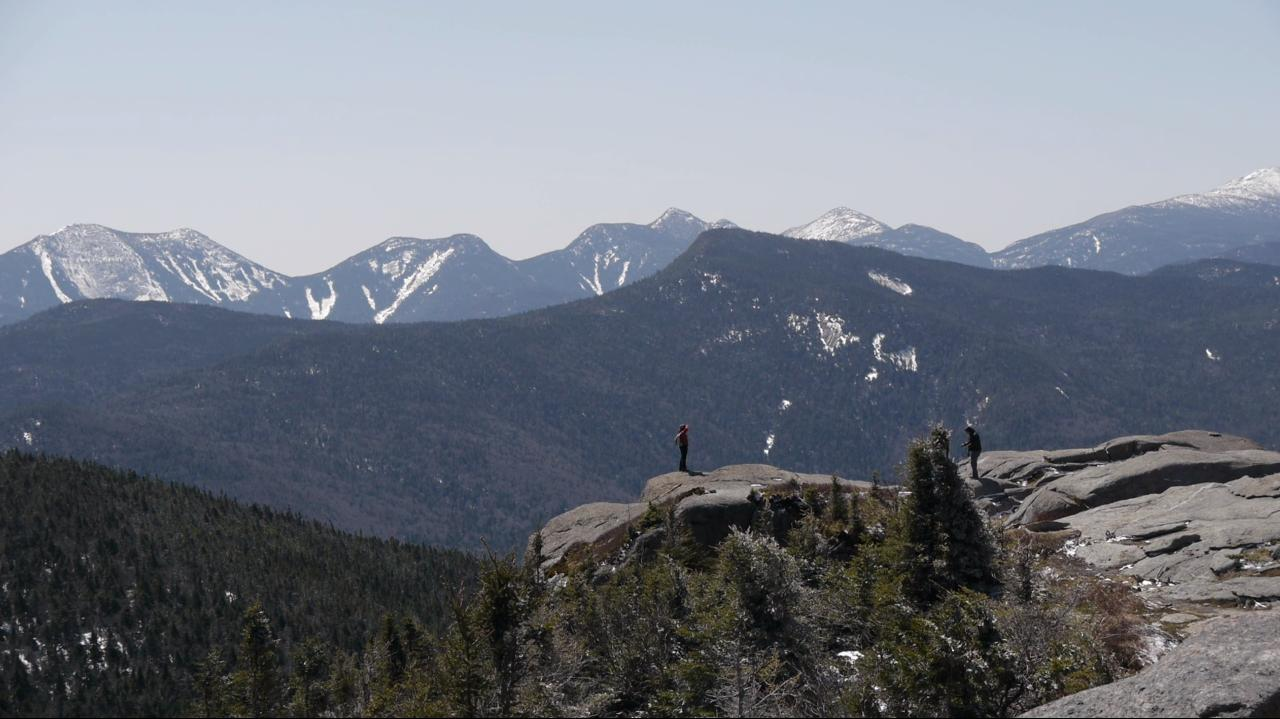
View of Porter (left), Big Slide (middle) and, from left to right in the background, Armstrong, Gothics, Saddleback from Cascade Mountain.

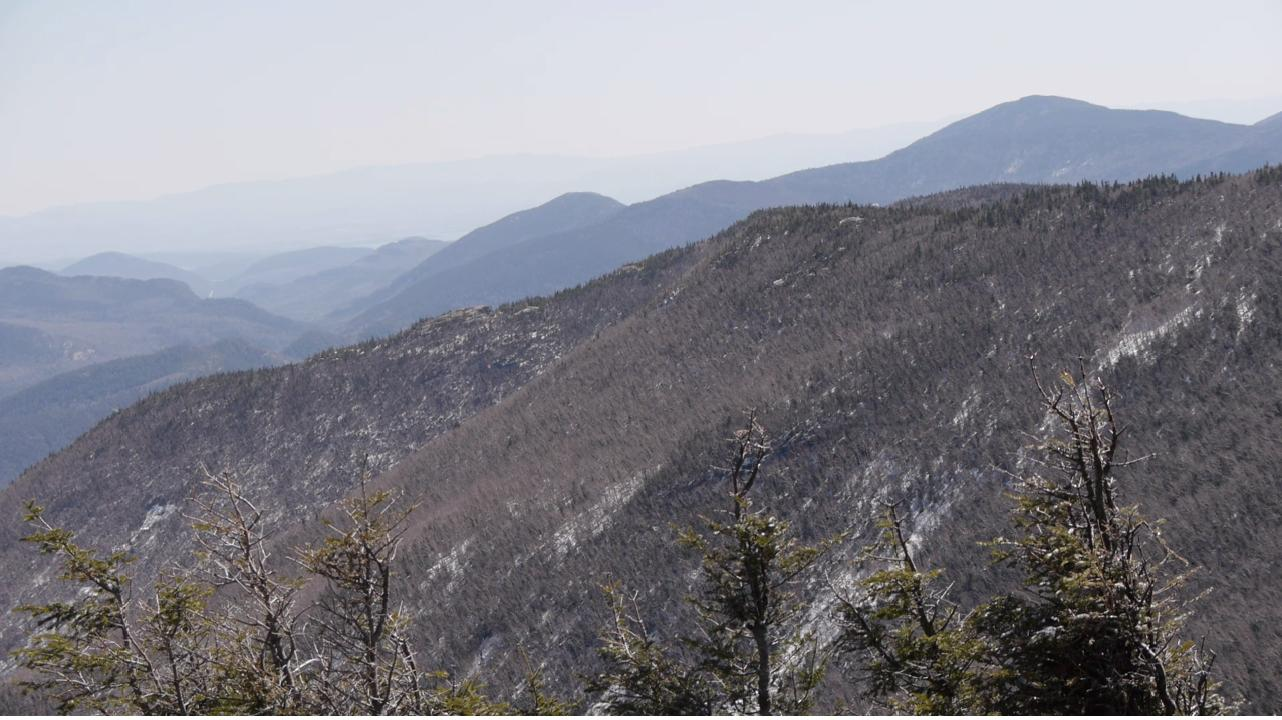
South-east view on Blueberry Mountain from Cascade Mountain.

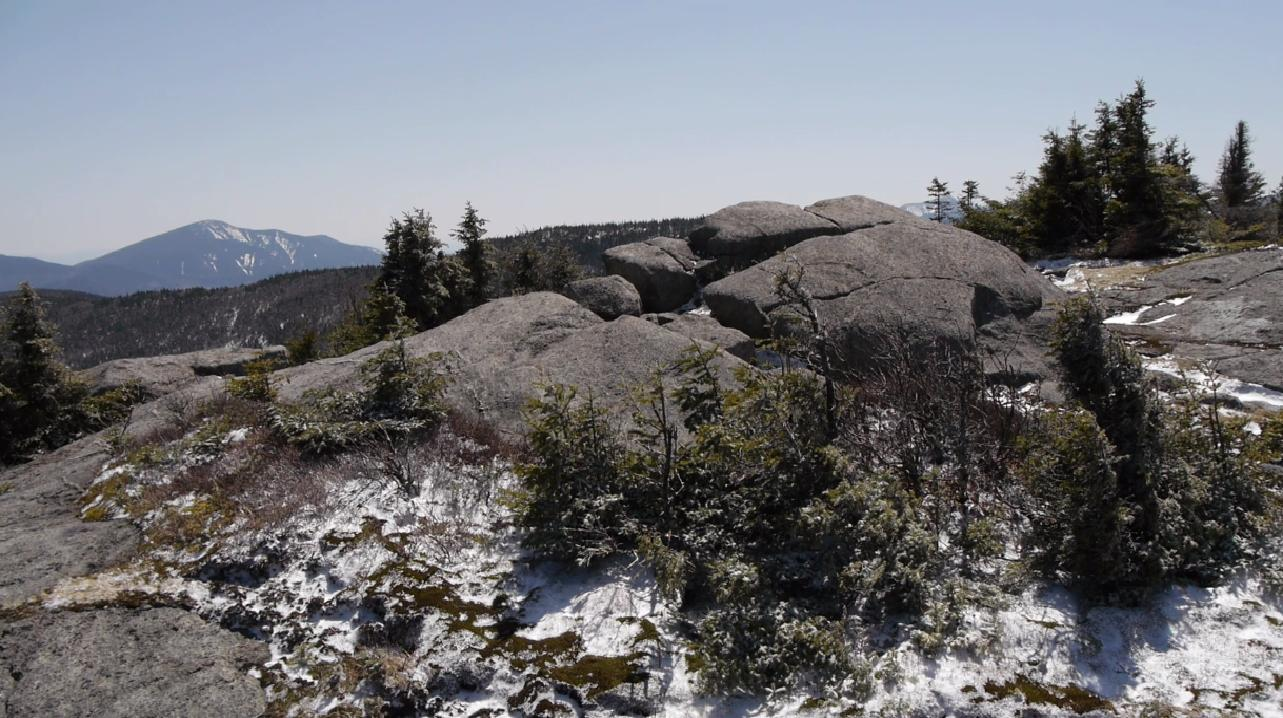
Top of the Cascade Mountain.

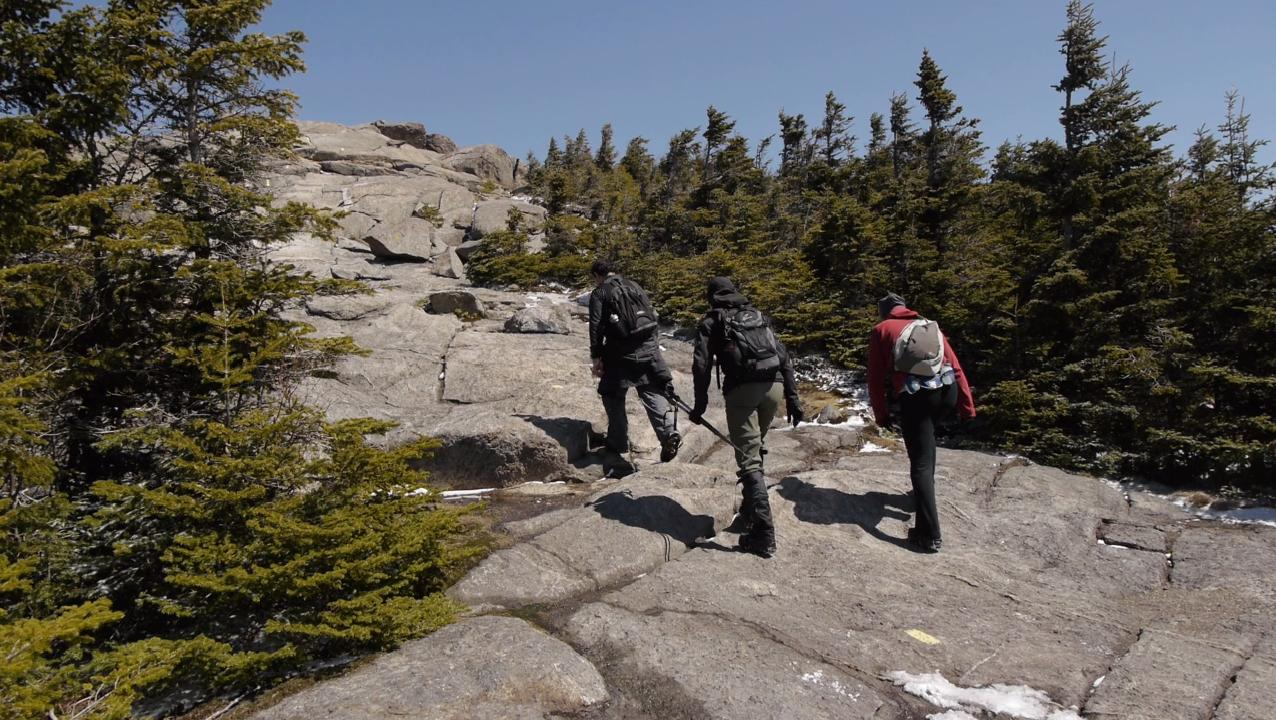
Ascent to the Summit Rock.
