= Yard Mountain =

Mountain in the United States

- Location within New York Adirondack Park Location within the United States

Highest point
- Elevation: 4,000 ft (1,200 m)
- Coordinates: 44°10′29″N 73°53′05″W

Geography
- Location: North Elba, Essex County, New York, U.S.
- Parent range: Adirondacks
- Topo map: USGS North Elba

Climbing
- Easiest route: Hike

Yard Mountain is a mountain in the High Peaks Region of the Adirondack Park in New York. Yard Mountains elevation is 4,000 feet (1,200 m) but it is not one of the High Peaks as it is too close to Big Slide Mountain.
