= Mount Redfield =

Mountain in New York, United States

- Location within New York Adirondack Park Location within the United States

Highest point
- Elevation: 4,606 ft (1,404 m) NGVD 29
- Listing: Adirondack High Peaks 15th
- Coordinates: 44°05′41″N 73°57′00″W

Geography
- Location: Keene, Essex County, New York
- Parent range: Marcy Group of the Great Range
- Topo map: USGS Mount Marcy

Climbing
- First ascent: 1894 by Ed Phelps and party

Mount Redfield is a mountain in the Adirondacks in the U.S. state of New York. It is the 15th-highest peak in New York, with an elevation of 4,606 feet (1,404 m), and one of the 46 High Peaks in Adirondack Park. It is located in the town of Keene in Essex County, near Cliff Mountain and Mount Skylight. Surveyor Verplanck Colvin named the mountain after William C. Redfield, organizer and member of an expedition to Mount Marcy in 1837, and the first to guess that Marcy was the highest peak in the Adirondacks, and therefore in New York. The earliest recorded ascent was made in 1894 by mountain guide Ed Phelps and a guest whose name has not been recorded.

There is no maintained trail on the mountain, but an unmarked trail begins at the Uphill Lean-to along the Calamity Brook Trail, and proceeds along Uphill Brook and a tributary stream to the summit.

== See also ==
- List of mountains in New York
- Northeast 111 4,000-footers
- Adirondack High Peaks
- Adirondack Forty-Sixers
