= William Redfield =

William Redfield may refer to:

- William C. Redfield (1858–1932), American politician, first U.S. Secretary of Commerce
- William Charles Redfield (1789–1857), American meteorologist
- William Redfield (actor) (1927–1976), American actor
