= Lean-to =

Shelter with a roof leaning against other structures

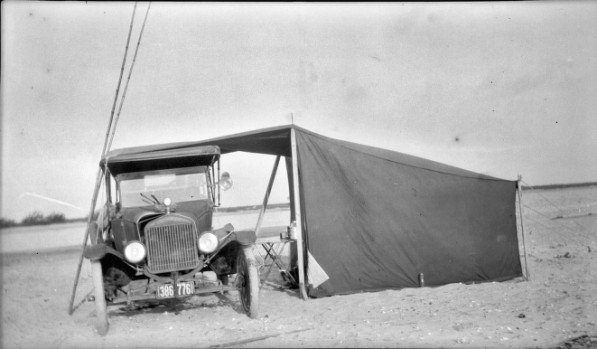
Lean-to tent shelter utilizing a car to support the roof

A lean-to is a type of simple structure originally added to an existing building with the rafters "leaning" against another wall. Free-standing structures open on one or more sides, generally used as shelters, are colloquially referred to as lean-tos in spite of being unattached to anything.

== Purposes ==
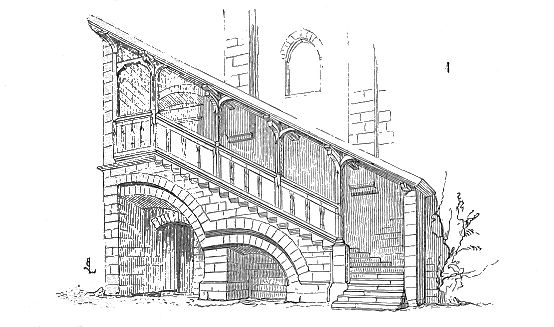
Lean-to (French: Appentis) against the walls of Meaux Cathedral

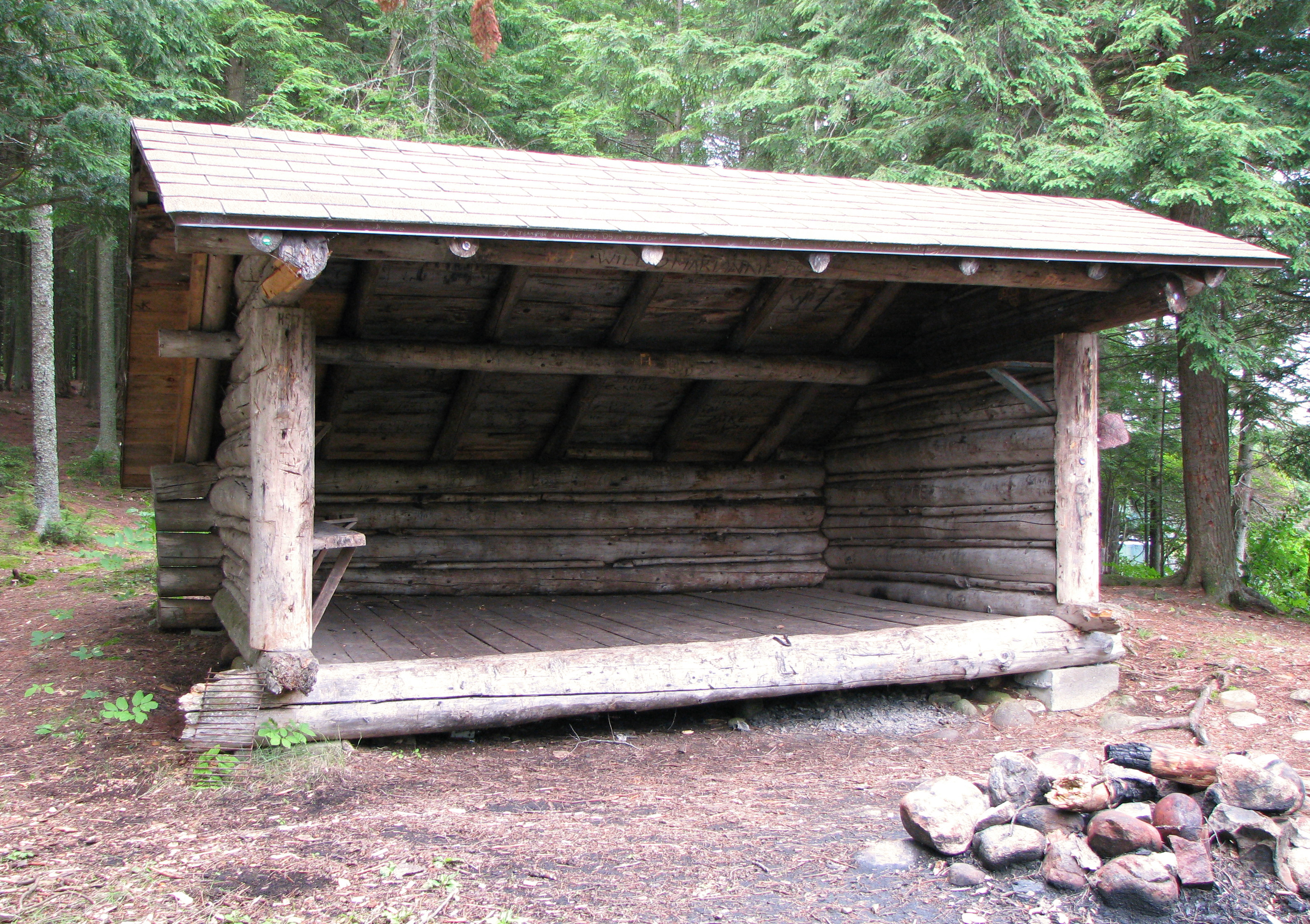
A typical free-standing Adirondack-style lean-to

A lean-to addition is an appendix to an existing structure constructed to fulfill a new need. Sometimes, it covers an external staircase, as in a 15th-century addition against one of the walls of the large chapter room of Meaux Cathedral. Other uses include protecting entrances, or establishing covered markets outside existing buildings.

== Examples ==
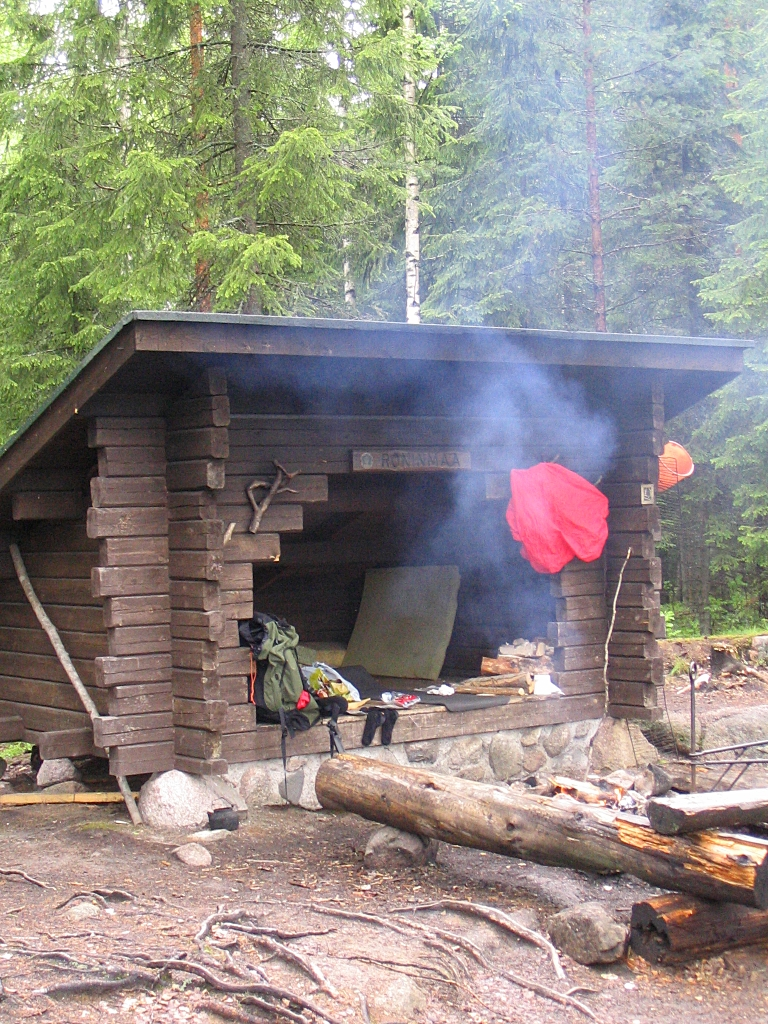
A laavu in the Pukala recreational forest

A lean-to is originally defined as a structure in which the rafters lean against another building or wall, also referred to in prior times as a penthouse. These structures characteristically have shed roofs, also referred to as "skillions", or "outshots" and "catslides" when the shed's roof is a direct extension of a larger structure's.

A lean-to shelter is a simplified free-standing version of a wilderness hut with three solid walls and a single- or, in the case of an Adirondack lean-to, offset-pitched gable roof. The open side is commonly oriented away from the prevailing weather. Often it is made of rough logs or unfinished wood and used for camping.

This style of lean-to is popular in Finland and Scandinavia, and is known as a laavu in Finnish, vindskydd, gapskjul or slogbod in Swedish, and gapahuk in Norwegian.
