= Alvah Dunning =

American Adirondack guide, hunter, trapper, and hermit (1816–1902)

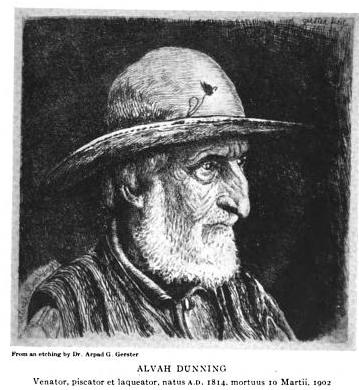
- Dunning, in a portrait reproduced in 1921
- Born: Alvah G. Dunning; June 1816; Near Lake Pleasant or Piseco, New York, U.S.
- Died: Overnight, March 10–11, 1902 (aged 85); Utica, New York, U.S.
- Occupations: Guide, hunter, trapper
- Known for: Early professional guiding in the Adirondack Mountains

Alvah G. Dunning (June 1816 – overnight March 10–11, 1902) was an American hunter, trapper, and professional guide in the Adirondack Mountains of northern New York. He became one of the best-known members of the first generation of Adirondack guides and was closely associated with Raquette Lake, where he lived for much of the second half of the nineteenth century.

Dunning guided visiting sportsmen and explorers, lived at several remote camps, and participated in Verplanck Colvin's 1870 expedition to Mount Seward. His career spanned the period in which the central Adirondacks changed from a sparsely settled working landscape into a destination shaped by tourism, private camps, railroads, game regulation, and state conservation. Accounts published during and after his lifetime turned him into a symbol of the older Adirondack woodsman, although later treatments have also emphasized his violence, hostility toward neighbors, and complicated dependence on the tourist economy he disliked.

== Early life ==
Dunning was born in June 1816 in the southern Adirondacks, probably near Lake Pleasant or Piseco in Hamilton County, New York. The exact day is uncertain. Later sources commonly gave his full name as Alvah G. Dunning and described his father as a hunter and trapper. Alfred L. Donaldson's 1921 history stated that Dunning began accompanying his father into the woods at six, killed his first moose at eleven, and guided travelers into the Raquette Lake country at twelve. These stories were recorded decades after the alleged events and are better understood as traditional accounts of his childhood than as precisely documented milestones.

Dunning married and lived in the Piseco area during the first half of his adult life. According to Donaldson and later regional accounts, he violently assaulted his wife after accusing her of infidelity and left the community around 1860 when neighbors condemned him and legal consequences threatened. Surviving accounts preserve little reliable information about his wife, the immediate legal outcome, or the exact date of his departure. The episode is nevertheless central to modern interpretations of his later isolation because it complicates the popular image of a harmless hermit who withdrew only from a preference for wilderness.

== Guide, hunter, and trapper ==
After leaving the Piseco area, Dunning lived for a time near Blue Mountain Lake and moved to the Raquette Lake country by the mid-1860s. He supported himself through hunting, trapping, fishing, shingle making, and occasional paid guiding. Adirondack guides of the period did more than show visitors a route. They managed boats, carried supplies, established camps, prepared food, located fish and game, and made decisions about weather and travel for clients unfamiliar with the interior. Dunning's woodcraft and knowledge of animal behavior gave him a considerable reputation among visiting sportsmen.

He was associated with the minister and travel writer William Henry Harrison Murray, whose 1869 book Adventures in the Wilderness helped produce a surge of tourism in the Adirondacks. Dunning initially lived at Indian Point on Raquette Lake and in the autumn of 1869 occupied an open camp on Osprey Island that Murray had used. Dunning enclosed the structure and remained on the island after it burned in 1875, replacing it with another rough camp. His bark-covered shanty was among the early rustic structures later connected with the development of the Adirondack Great Camp style.

Stories about Dunning's hunting were a major part of his public reputation. He claimed to have killed the last native moose in the Adirondacks in March 1862, but the claim was disputed even in early historical accounts. Donaldson compared it with a separate report that a guide named Palmer killed a cow moose near Raquette Lake in 1861 and concluded that the question could not be resolved. Large totals later attributed to Dunning for panthers, moose, and other animals also depended heavily on reminiscence and newspaper repetition rather than surviving records.

== Mount Seward expedition ==
In October 1870, Dunning guided surveyor Verplanck Colvin during an expedition to measure Mount Seward. Colvin's published account described the guide he selected at Raquette Lake as an older, energetic woodsman who was born and raised as a hunter, although the narrative referred to him only as "the guide." Later Adirondack histories identify the man as Dunning.

The party traveled by way of Cold River and climbed through rain, fog, dense forest, and dwarf balsam. Colvin made barometric observations from the summit on October 15. His report became an early statement of the case for protecting Adirondack forests because of their importance to New York's water supply. Dunning's role placed an experienced local guide inside an expedition later associated with the mapping and conservation of the region, even though the regulations and formal control that followed often conflicted with the hunting and land-use practices he defended.

== Raquette Lake residences and land disputes ==
Dunning's residence on Osprey Island rested on occupation rather than uncontested legal title. When members of the Thomas C. Durant family sought control of the property around 1880 or 1881, Dunning initially refused to leave and reportedly threatened armed resistance. Donaldson wrote that Heloise Durant eventually persuaded him to accept $100 and move. The episode became one of several stories used to portray Dunning as both combative and susceptible to personal negotiation.

After leaving Osprey Island, Dunning spent time near Eighth Lake and returned to Raquette Lake. A later New York land-title case preserved unusually detailed evidence about his final long-term home. The court found that in spring 1882 he built a house on a tract along the western shore of Raquette Lake, cleared land, raised crops and vegetables, made shingles, and occupied the property continuously for seventeen years. The tract was accessible only by primitive trails and waterways when he settled there.

The projected Raquette Lake Railway ended that period of isolation. On May 25, 1899, Dunning agreed to transfer his claimed interest in the land, together with three boats and the stores and furniture at his camp, to the railway company. He executed a deed on June 24. The court later treated his occupation and the deed as important evidence in a dispute over adverse possession and title to property that became part of the hamlet of Raquette Lake.

== Views on game laws ==
Dunning opposed game laws that restricted local subsistence hunting while allowing visiting sportsmen to kill animals for recreation. In an 1897 statement later analyzed by historian Karl Jacoby, he contrasted residents who took deer for meat with wealthy hunters who sometimes removed trophies and left carcasses in the woods. Jacoby used Dunning's comments as evidence of the conflict between local ideas of necessity and the state's increasingly regulated system of conservation.

His position was not a general opposition to restraint. Donaldson's informants remembered him objecting to wasteful killing and refusing to tolerate mistreatment of his dogs. One guide who knew him described him as willing to take deer or trout outside the legal season when he needed them, but opposed to killing game without using it. Jacoby placed Dunning's views within a broader Adirondack belief that access to wild game was tied to household independence and republican freedom rather than a privilege reserved for landowners or tourists.

== Later life and death ==
After selling his Raquette Lake claim in 1899, Dunning traveled west in search of another place to live but returned to the Adirondacks within about a year. By then his health and independence had declined. He stayed near Golden Beach or South Inlet, accepted help and employment from summer residents, and spent winters with relatives, particularly a sister in Syracuse, New York.

In March 1902, Dunning appeared at a sportsmen's exhibition in New York City, where he was presented to the public as a survivor of the older generation of Adirondack guides. On the return journey he stopped at the Dudley House in Utica. He was found dead in his room on the morning of March 11 after illuminating gas leaked from a fixture during the night. Contemporary reports and Donaldson treated the death as accidental. Sources differ by one day because some give the presumed date of death as March 10 while newspapers reported the discovery on March 11.

== Reputation and legacy ==
During Dunning's old age, photographs by Seneca Ray Stoddard, an etching by surgeon and artist Arpad Gerster, and newspaper profiles fixed his public image as "Uncle Alvah," a white-bearded relic of the early Adirondacks. Gerster raised money for a gold watch after Dunning lost an earlier watch while fishing. According to Donaldson, Dunning carried the replacement for the rest of his life and it was among his possessions when he died. Photographs and prints of Dunning are held by Adirondack Experience, formerly the Adirondack Museum.

Donaldson devoted a full chapter of his 1921 A History of the Adirondacks to Dunning. That account preserved testimony from people who knew him, but its language also reflected the period's tendency to cast rural guides as "primitive" survivors. Modern regional histories continue to identify Dunning as one of the earliest and best-known Adirondack guides while treating his legend more critically. His recorded comments on subsistence, game laws, and visiting sportsmen have also been used in scholarship examining class conflict and the social history of American conservation.

In 2026, Marcus Rourke published No Wilderness to Die In: The Life of Alvah Dunning, Adirondack Guide and Hermit, a book-length biography examining Dunning through public records, travel accounts, newspapers, photographs, genealogical materials, and earlier regional histories. The book distinguishes documented events from the legends that developed around Dunning, presenting him as both an accomplished woodsman and a contradictory figure shaped by tourism, game regulation, private land ownership, and the changing Adirondack wilderness.

== See also ==
- Mitchell Sabattis
- French Louie
- Noah John Rondeau
