= Alfred L. Donaldson =

American banker and writer (1866–1923)

Alfred Lee Donaldson (1866 – 1923) was an American banker and writer. Originally active in New York City, he moved to Saranac Lake, New York in February 1895, to be treated for tuberculosis by Edward Livingston Trudeau. With two other men in the same circumstances, he founded the Adirondack National Bank in 1897, the first national bank in the Adirondacks. When his health made continued work impossible, he wrote A History of the Adirondacks, a comprehensive two volume history of the park, published in 1921. Donaldson Mountain, part of the Seward Range, is named for him.

== Bibliography ==
- Alfred L Donaldson, A History of the Adirondacks, New York: The Century Co., 1921 (reprinted by Purple Mountain Press, Fleischmanns, NY, 1992)
