= Redfield College =

Redfield College may refer to:

- Redfield College (New South Wales), Australia
- Redfield College (South Dakota), United States; defunct
