= Léonard Rist =

Léonard Rist (1905–1982) was a French economist and banker.

He was the son of Charles Rist, the economist. Working in America he returned to France to enlist in 1939. He was imprisoned by the Nazi forces following the German occupation of France in the summer of 1940, and spent 18 months in prison camps in Silesia and Sudetenland. The bankers of the House of Morgan, where Rist was employed, managed to get him out.

After the war, Rist became the first chief economist of the World Bank. Rist held various positions at the World Bank for 20 years.

== Sources ==
- Chernow, Ron (1990). House of Morgan, Grove Press
- Kapur, Devesh, John Prior Lewis and Richard Charles Webb (1997) The World Bank: History, Brookings Institution Press, ISBN 0815752342
- Léonard Rist's profile at the World Bank
