= William Charles Redfield =

American meteorologist

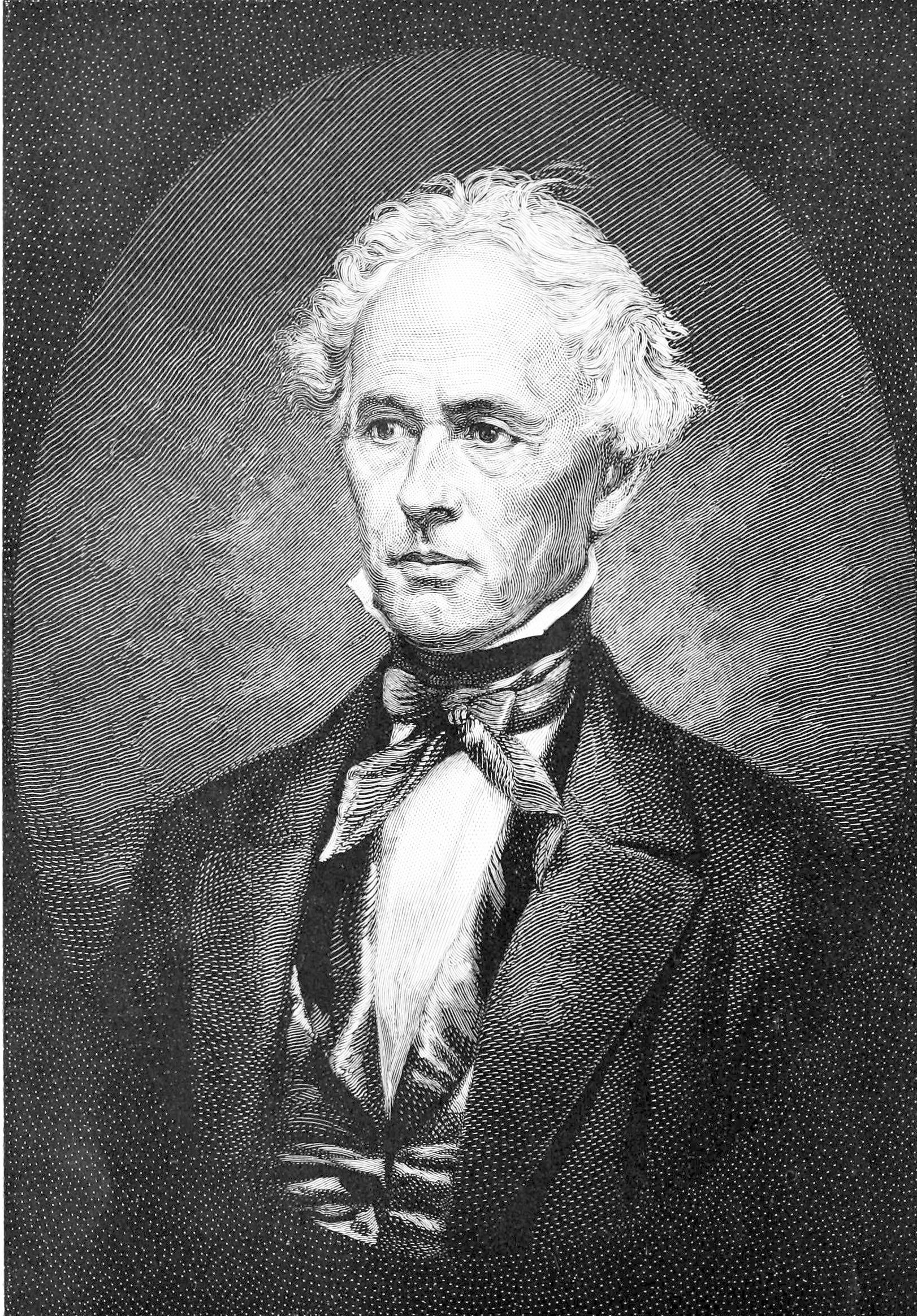
William C. Redfield

William C. Redfield (Note: According to Redfield's son John Howard Redfield, his father was baptized simply William Redfield "but on becoming of age, having some occasion to sign some legal paper, at the suggestion of the town clerk, he added the C. to distinguish him from two cousins of the same name". However, the middle name "Charles" is used in several encyclopedias and directories published after Redfield's death.) (March 26, 1789 – February 12, 1857) was an American meteorologist. He was the first president of the American Association for the Advancement of Science (1848).

Redfield is known in meteorology for his observation of the directionality of winds in hurricanes, being among the first to propose that hurricanes are large circular vortexes (John Farrar had made similar observations six years earlier), though his interests were varied and influential.

Redfield organized and was a member of the first expedition to Mount Marcy in 1837; he was the first to correctly guess that Marcy was the highest peak in the Adirondacks, and therefore in New York. Mount Redfield was named in his honor by Verplanck Colvin. He was elected a member of the American Philosophical Society in 1844 and an Associate Fellow of the American Academy of Arts and Sciences in 1845.

At a meeting of the American Association for the Advancement of Science, in 1854, Redfield mentioned a storm-path in which no less than seventy odd vessels had been wrecked, dismasted, or damaged.
