= Cliff Mountain (New York) =

Mountain in New York, United States

- Location within New York Adirondack Park Location within the United States

Highest point
- Elevation: 3,960 ft (1,210 m) NGVD 29
- Listing: Adirondack High Peaks 44th
- Coordinates: 44°06′11″N 73°58′31″W

Geography
- Location: Newcomb / Keene, Essex County, New York
- Parent range: Marcy Group of the Great Range
- Topo map: USGS Mount Marcy

Climbing
- First ascent: June 17, 1921, by Arthur S. Hopkins
- Easiest route: Hike

Cliff Mountain is a mountain located in Essex County, New York. The mountain is part of the Marcy Group of the Great Range of the Adirondack Mountains. Cliff is flanked to the southeast by Mount Redfield.

Cliff Mountain stands within the watershed of the Opalescent River, a tributary of the Hudson River, which in turn drains into New York Bay. The north and west sides of Cliff Mtn. drain directly into the Opalescent River. The southeast side drains into Upper Twin Brook, thence into the Opalescent River.

According to the 1897 survey of the Adirondacks, the height of Cliff Mountain was over 4,000 feet (1,219 m), so it was included in the 46 High Peaks; the 1953 USGS survey found it and three other peaks to be lower, but the list has not been changed. The mountain is within the High Peaks Wilderness Area of Adirondack State Park. No marked trail leads to its summit.

== See also ==
- List of mountains in New York
- Northeast 111 4,000-footers
- Adirondack High Peaks
- Adirondack Forty-Sixers
