= Gray Peak (New York) =

Mountain in United States

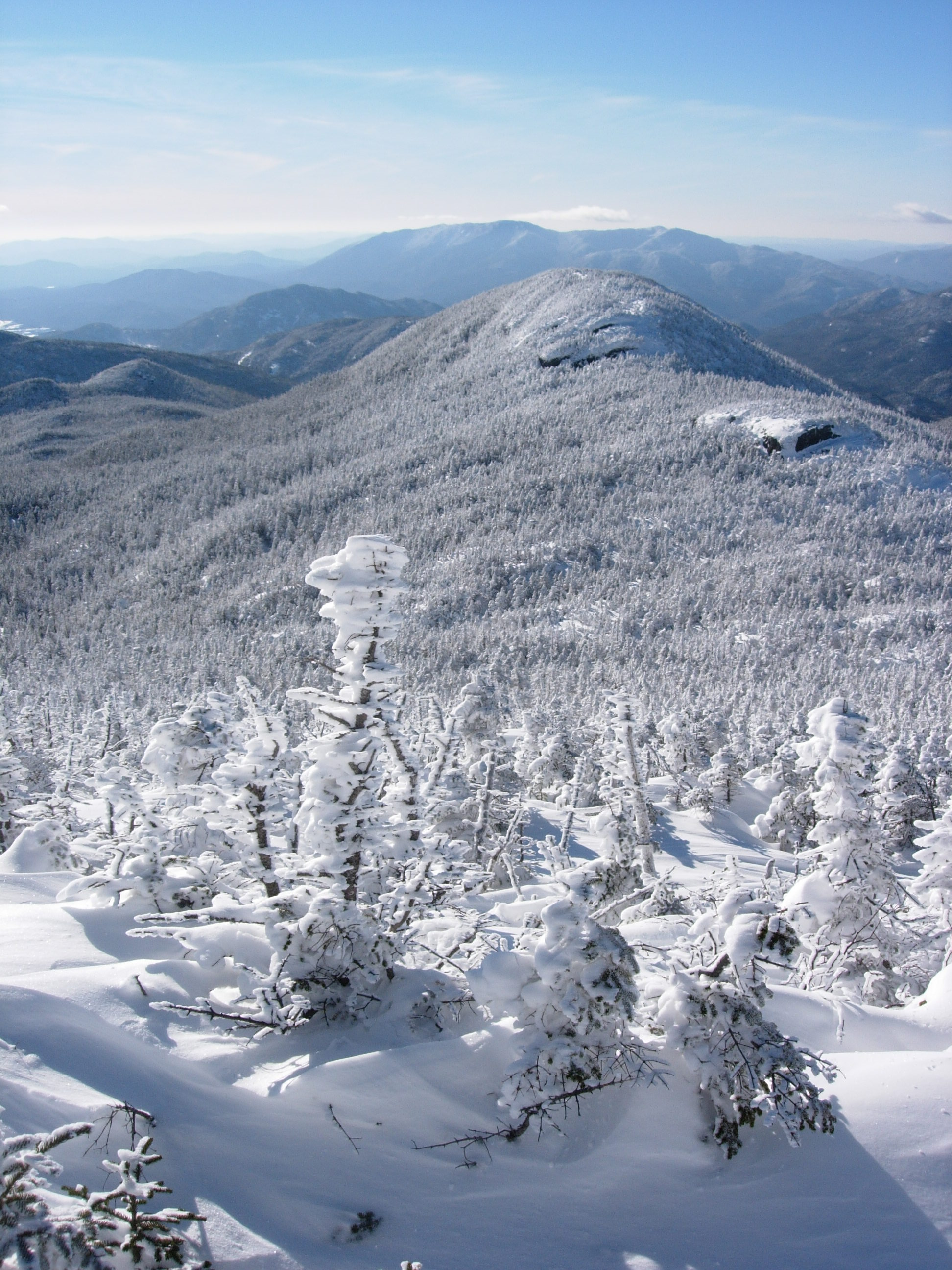
- View of Gray Peak from Mount Marcy in winter.

Highest point
- Elevation: 4,840 ft (1,480 m) NGVD 29
- Listing: Adirondack High Peaks 7th
- Coordinates: 44°06′41″N 73°56′06″W

Geography
- Location within New York Adirondack Park Location within the United States
- Location: Keene, New York, U.S.
- Parent range: Adirondacks
- Topo map: USGS Mount Marcy

Climbing
- First ascent: September 16, 1872 by Verplanck Colvin and Bill Nye
- Easiest route: Hike

Gray Peak is a mountain located in the town of Keene in Essex County, New York. It is the seventh-highest of the Adirondack High Peaks, with an elevation of 4,840 feet (1,480 m), and is located in close proximity to Mount Marcy, the highest peak in New York. Gray Peak is southwest of Mount Marcy and southeast of Mount Colden. The first recorded ascent of the peak was made on September 16, 1872, by surveyor Verplanck Colvin and guide Bill Nye. It was named for Asa Gray by Colvin. Although the mountain is only 0.6 miles (0.97 km) from the summit of Marcy and lacked prominence desired by the Marshall brothers for inclusion in the High Peaks, it was added to the list to preserve the name.

Gray Peak can be climbed on an unmarked trail from Lake Tear of the Clouds, which can be approached from the Elk Lake or Upper Works parking lots. It is the highest peak in the Adirondacks without a maintained and marked trail.
