= Justice Redfield =

Justice Redfield may refer to:

- Isaac F. Redfield (1804–1876), associate justice of the Vermont Supreme Court
- Timothy P. Redfield (1812–1888), associate justice of the Vermont Supreme Court
