= Mount Skylight =

Mountain in United States of America

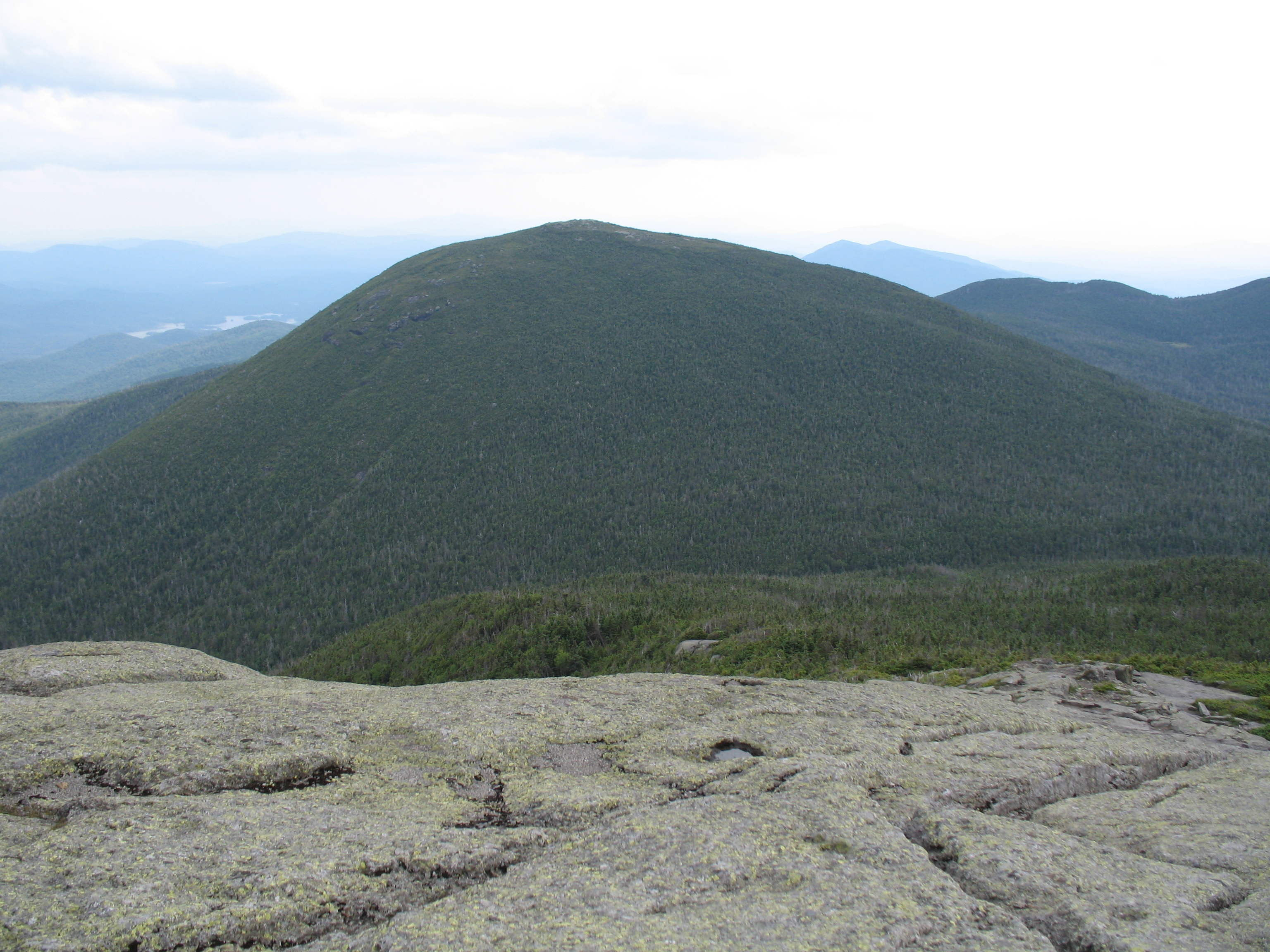
- Mount Skylight as seen from the summit of Mount Marcy.

Highest point
- Elevation: 4,924 ft (1,501 m) NGVD 29
- Listing: Adirondack High Peaks 4th
- Coordinates: 44°05′58″N 73°55′51″W

Geography
- Location within New York
- Location: Keene, New York, U.S.
- Parent range: Adirondacks
- Topo map: USGS Mount Marcy

Climbing
- First ascent: Verplanck Colvin, Orson Schofield Phelps and unknown party, 1873 (first recorded)
- Easiest route: Hike

Mount Skylight is a mountain in the Adirondacks in the U.S. state of New York. Skylight is the fourth-highest peak in New York, with an elevation of 4,924 feet (1,501 m), and one of the 46 High Peaks in Adirondack Park. It is located in the town of Keene in Essex County. The mountain was given its name by artist Frederick S. Perkins and guide Orson Schofield Phelps in 1857, due to a rock formation on the peak resembling a window. Phelps would later make the first known ascent of the peak with surveyor Verplanck Colvin and two others on August 28, 1873.

== Hiking trails ==
A single trail goes 0.5 miles (0.80 km) up to the mountain's summit from the Four Corners junction between Skylight and Mount Marcy, its northern neighbor.

Three other trails lead to the intersection. Most commonly, hikers approach from the west, via the Feldspar Brook Trail from the campsites at the Flowed Lands and climb the peak in conjunction with a visit to Lake Tear of the Clouds, and a climb up neighboring, trail-less Gray Peak. The distance from the Upper Works trailhead to the Four Corners junction is 9.5 miles (15.3 km).

The Four Corners can also be reached by descending from Marcy to the north, or via Panther Gorge and Elk Lake to the southeast on a trail of 10.2 miles (16.4 km). All are lengthy trips that are usually done via an overnight backpack. The summit offers views of 30 major peaks. Hikers traditionally carried a rock to the summit to add to a cairn, but this practice is now discouraged.

== Gallery ==
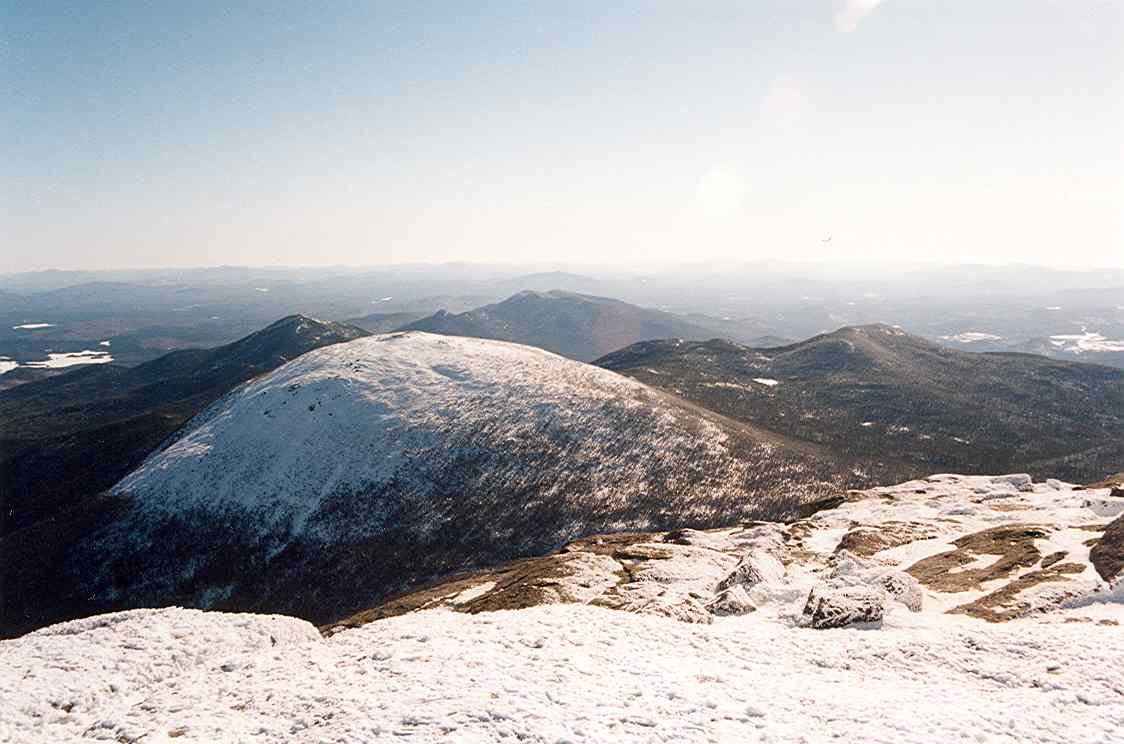
Mount Skylight seen from Mt. Marcy

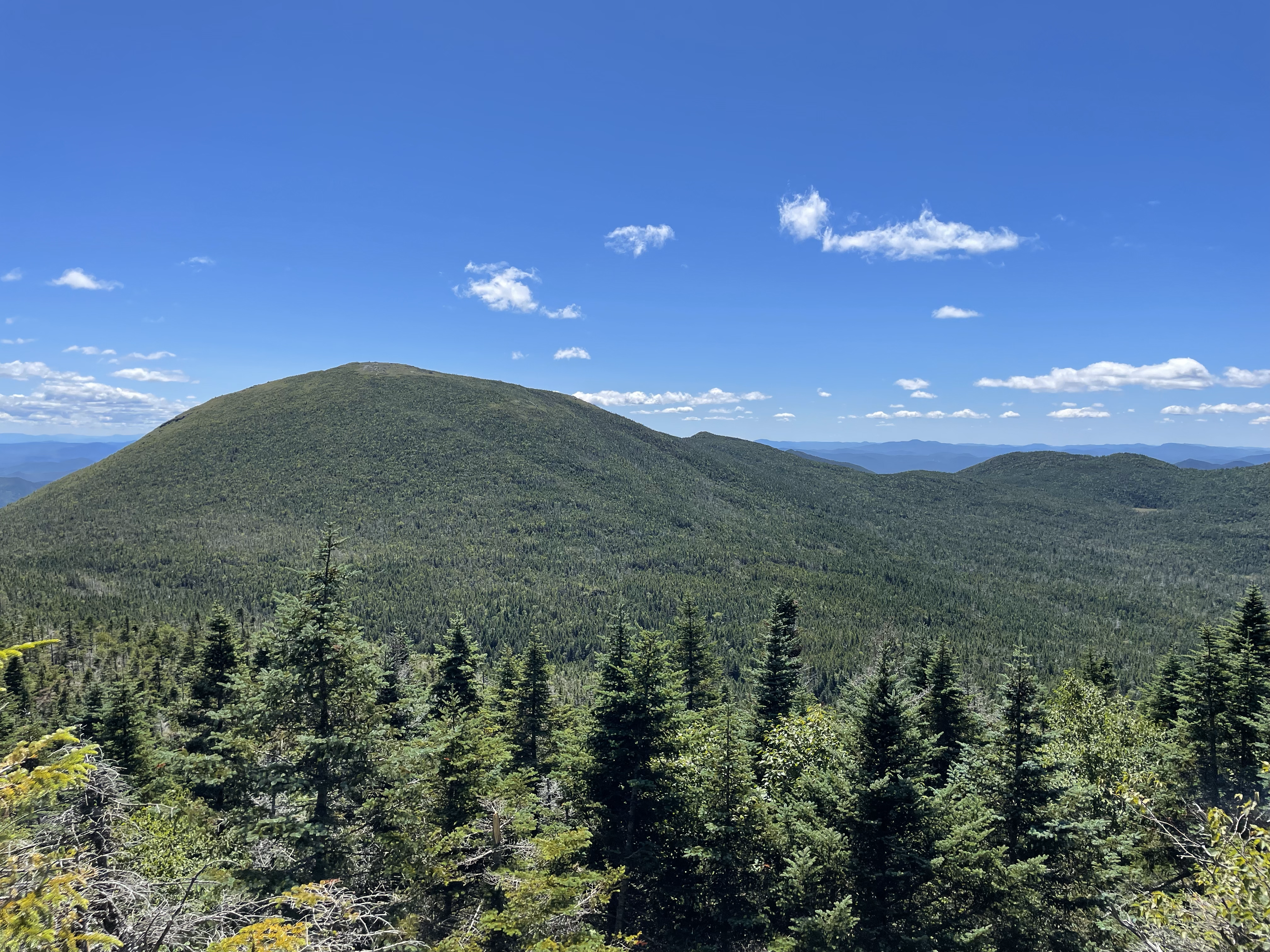
Mount Skylight seen from Gray Peak
