= Charles Rist =

French economist

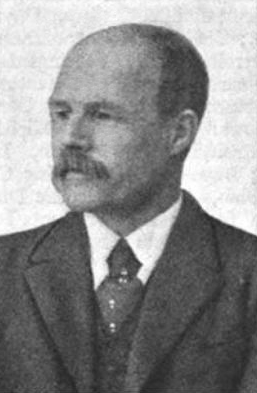
- Born: 1 January 1874; Prilly, France
- Died: 11 January 1955 (aged 81); Paris, France
- Occupation: Economist

Charles Rist (1 January 1874 – 11 January 1955) was a French economist. He established Institute Research Économiques Et Sociales (IRES) in 1933.

He was elected an International Honorary Member of the American Academy of Arts and Sciences in 1932 and an International Member of the American Philosophical Society in 1938. His son was Léonard Rist.

Charles Rist died in Paris on 11 January 1955.

== Works ==
- Rist, Charles; Charles Gide (1915). A History of Economic Doctrines from the Time of the Physiocrats to the Present Day. Translated by R. Richards. London: George P. Harrap – via Internet Archive.
- Rist, Charles. 1921. Les Finances de Guerre de l'Allemagne. Payot et Cie, Paris.
- Rist, Charles (1940). History of Monetary and Credit Theory from John Law to the Present Day. Translated by Degras, Jane. New York: Macmillan Company – via Internet Archive.

== See also ==
- Money doctor
