= Big Slide Mountain (New York) =

Mountain in New York, United States

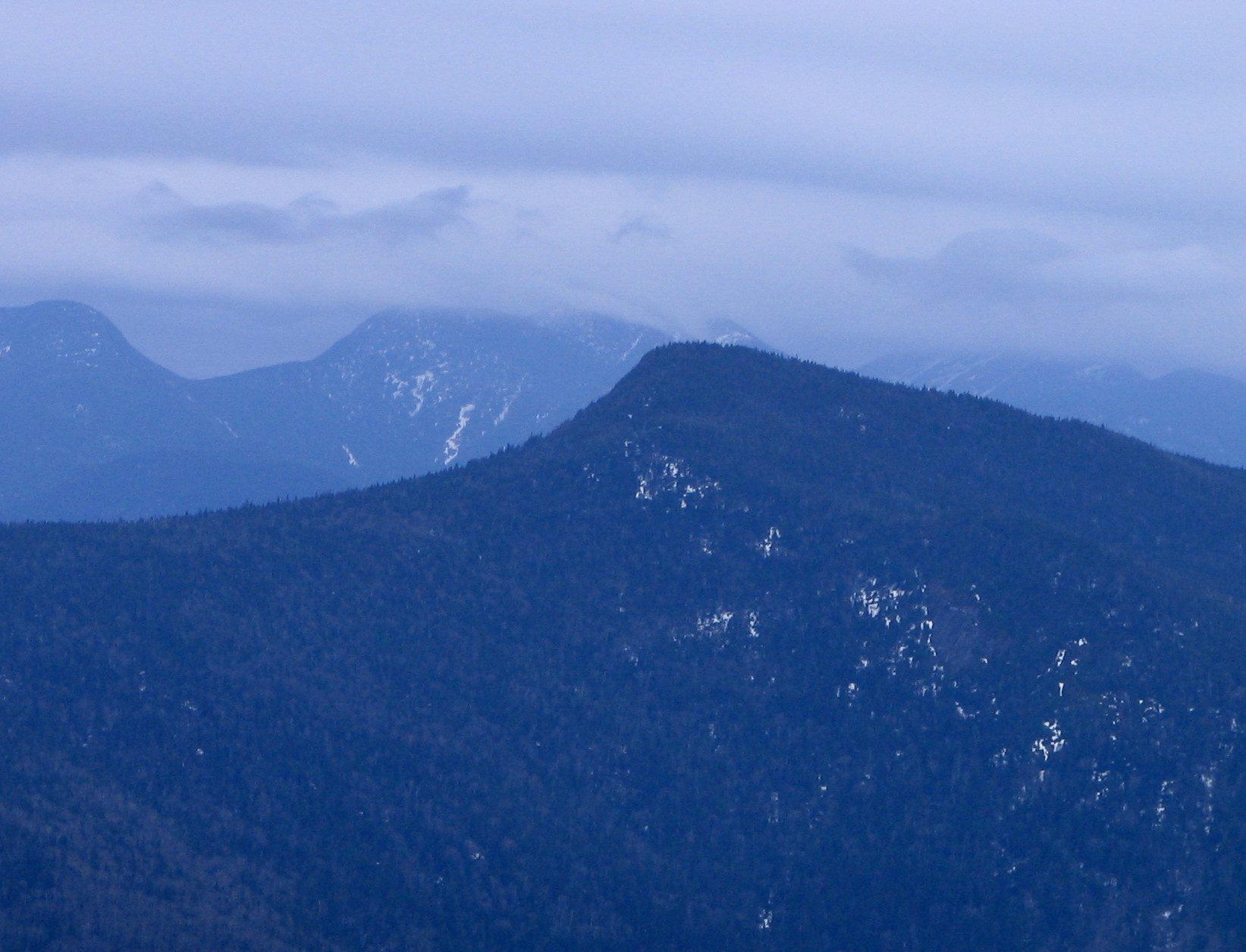
- Big Slide Mountain as seen from Cascade Mountain

Highest point
- Elevation: 4,240 ft (1,290 m) NGVD 29
- Listing: Adirondack High Peaks 27th
- Coordinates: 44°10′56″N 73°52′14″W

Geography
- Location within New York Adirondack Park Location within the United States
- Location: Keene / North Elba, New York, U.S.
- Parent range: Adirondacks
- Topo map: USGS Keene Valley

Climbing
- First ascent: 1812, by John Richards
- Easiest route: Hike

Big Slide Mountain is a mountain in the Adirondacks in the U.S. state of New York. It is the 27th-highest of the Adirondack High Peaks, with an elevation of 4,240 feet (1,290 m). The mountain is located in the town of Keene in Essex County. The Johns Brook Valley lies to its east and the South Meadow to its west. The earliest recorded ascent of the mountain was made in 1812 when a surveyor named John Richards was marking the lot lines in Township 12 of the Old Military Tract. The peak was later named for one of two prominent landslides which occurred in 1830 and 1856.

Three hiking approaches are available to the summit of Big Slide, which offers views of the nearby Great Range, Giant Mountain, and Algonquin Peak. One approach is via the Brothers, a set of three rocky crags which offer several views on the way to the summit. This blue-blazed trail begins at the Garden parking lot on New York State Route 73 in Keene Valley, and continues over the Brothers to the junction with the red-blazed Slide Mountain Brook Trail, which proceeds to the summit for a total distance of 4.0 miles (6.4 km) and ascent of 2,800 feet (850 m).

Big Slide can also be climbed via the Slide Mountain Brook Trail from the Phelps trail in Johns Brook Valley, or combined with Yard Mountain via the Klondike Notch trail (Yard's elevation is 4,018 feet (1,225 m), but it is not considered one of the High Peaks, as it is too close to Big Slide). Both of these routes begin from Garden parking lot on the yellow-blazed Phelps Trail. The Phelps Trail passes the DEC Interior Outpost after 3.1 miles (5.0 km). The Slide Mountain Brook Trail begins from the Phelps Trail another 0.1 miles (0.16 km) from the outpost and continues the final 2.4 miles (3.9 km) to the summit of Big Slide, for a total distance of 5.6 miles (9.0 km) and ascent of 2,000 feet (610 m). Finally, the red-blazed Klondike Notch Trail diverges from the Phelps Trail at Johns Brook Lodge, 3.5 miles (5.6 km) from the Garden parking lot. After 1.3 miles (2.1 km), the blue-blazed Big Slide Trail diverges and travels over the summit of Yard to the summit of Big Slide, for a total distance of 7.5 miles (12.1 km) and ascent of 1,927 feet (587 m).

== Gallery ==
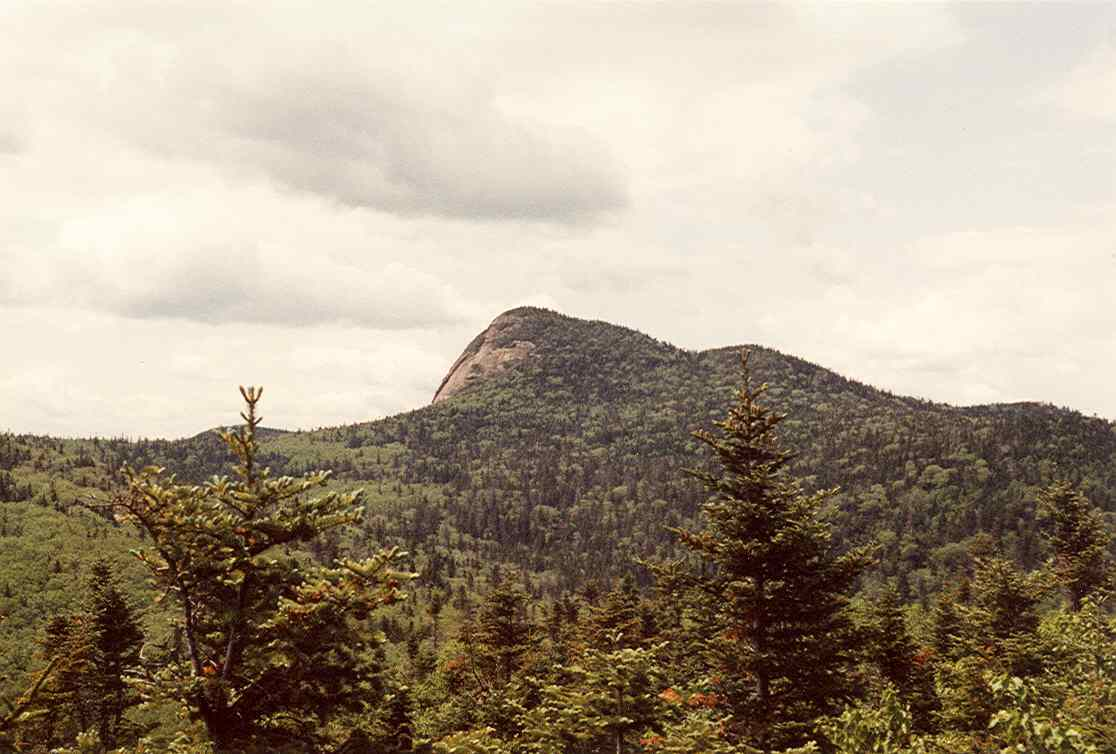
Big Slide Mountain seen from The Brothers Trail

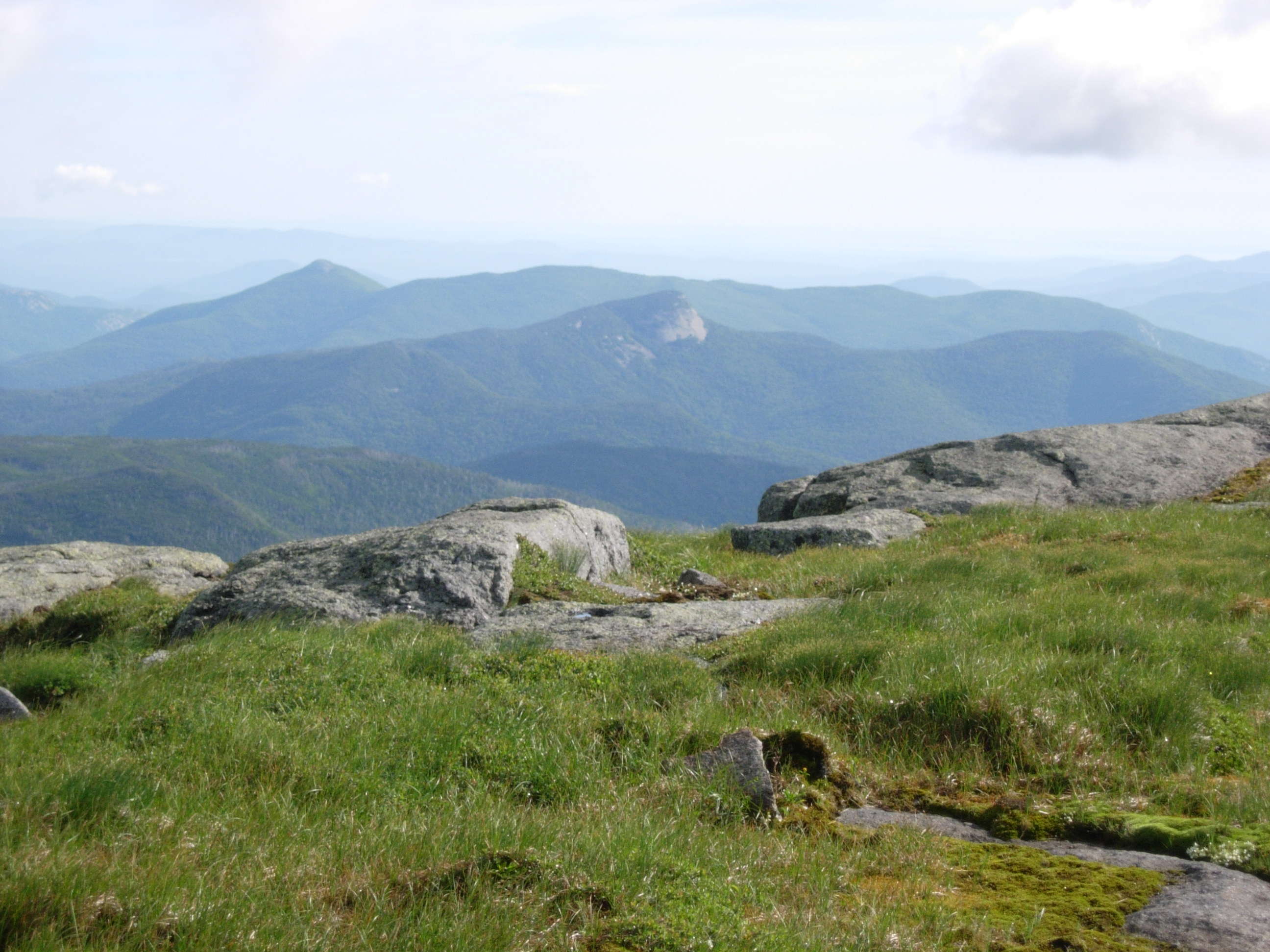
Big Slide Mountain as seen from Mount Marcy
