= Adirondack lean-to =

Camping shelter

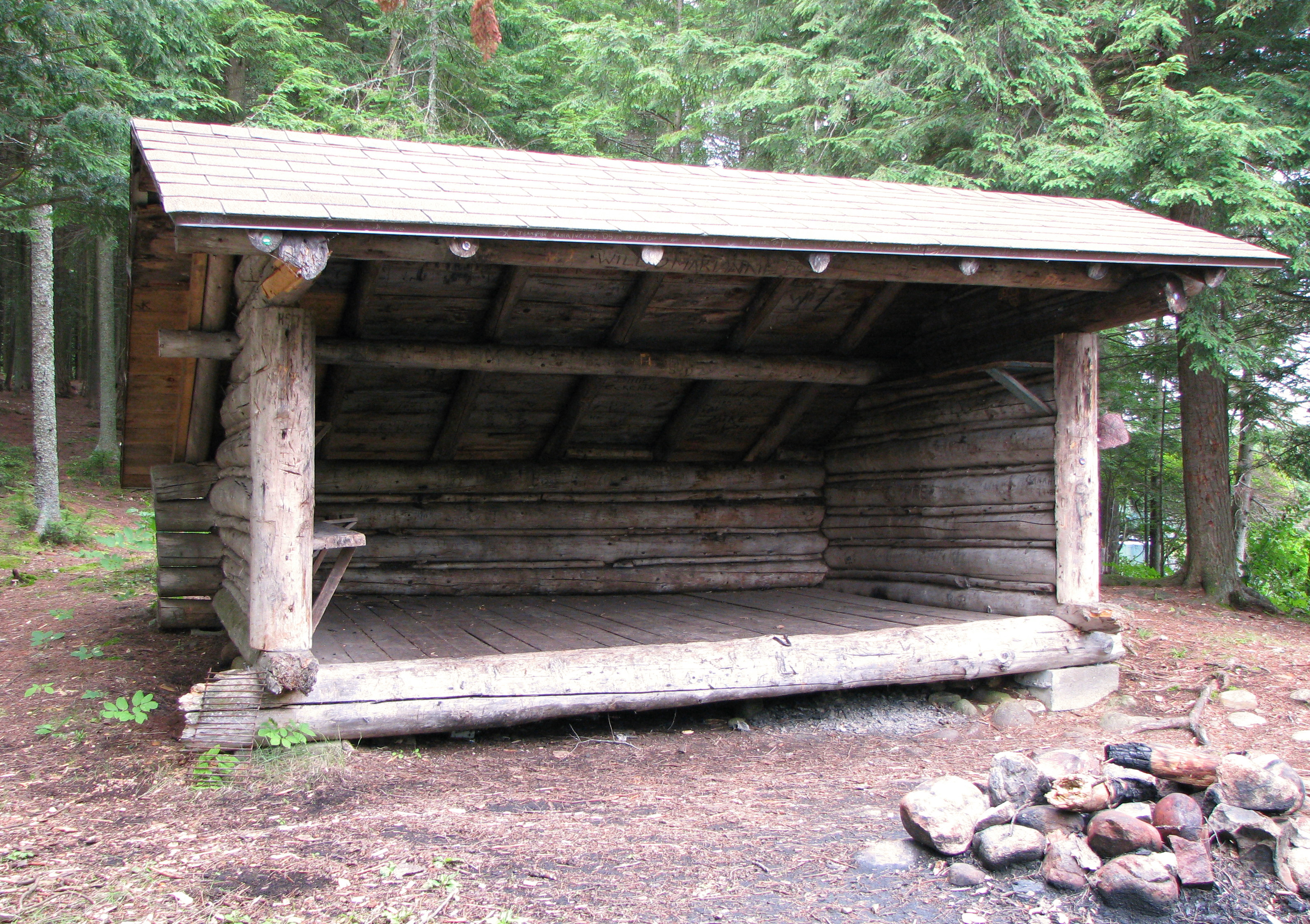
A lean-to at Black Pond, Keese Mill, New York

An Adirondack lean-to or Adirondack shelter is a three-sided log structure popularized in the Adirondack Mountains of Upstate New York which provides shelter for campers. Since their development in the Adirondacks, this type of shelter has seen use in a number of parks throughout the United States, such as Isle Royale National Park in Michigan and Indian Cave State Park in Nebraska, as well as in parts of Canada. It is similar to the Nordic laavu.

== History ==
The Adirondack lean-to was developed by guides of the region as convenient camps to house hunting and fishing parties. The earliest of these shelters were quickly and crudely built but they still offered shelter from the elements.

As the Adirondacks developed, so did the lean-to structures. The previous temporary structures were replaced by sturdy log structures. Made from what was available, balsam or spruce logs were commonly used. Cedar has replaced these species as the primary log, due to its natural rot resistance and easy workability. Some High Peaks lean-tos do not have fire rings in front of them.

"The official New York State Conservation Department model [was] constructed in the 1930s by the Civilian Conservation Corps."

== Public Adirondack lean-tos ==
The state of New York owns or controls more than half of the 6 million acres (24,000 km^{2}) in the Adirondacks. Most of this is protected by Section One of Article 14 of the state's constitution, known as the Forever Wild Clause: “The lands of the state, now owned or hereafter acquired, constituting the forest preserve as now fixed by law, shall be forever kept as wild forest lands”.

Adirondack lean-tos have been the unique exception to this clause. There are several hundred public lean-tos in the Adirondacks and along the Appalachian Trail. These refuges are generally open to the public on a first-come-first-served basis.

== See also ==
- Wilderness hut
- Bivouac shelter
- Bothy
- Mountain hut
