= Verplanck Colvin =

American lawyer

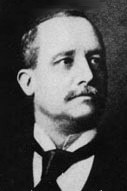
- Verplanck Colvin
- Born: January 4, 1847; Albany, New York, US
- Died: May 28, 1920 (aged 73); Troy, New York, US
- Occupation(s): Author; Topographical Engineer
- Known for: Surveys of the Adirondack Mountains

Verplanck Colvin (January 4, 1847 – May 28, 1920) was a lawyer, author, illustrator and topographical engineer whose understanding and appreciation for the environment of the Adirondack Mountains led to the creation of New York's Forest Preserve and the Adirondack Park.

== Biography ==
Colvin was born on January 4, 1847, in Albany, New York, to Andrew James Colvin, a wealthy lawyer, and his second wife, Margaret Crane Alling; his first name was his grandmother's maiden name. He was tutored for several years before entering The Albany Academy; then, during the Civil War the family moved to Nassau; there he attended Nassau Academy, where he excelled in the sciences, and graduated in 1864. Although he preferred attending West Point Military Academy, he joined his father's law office in Albany and was later admitted to the bar. Working in real estate law gave him his first experience in surveying.

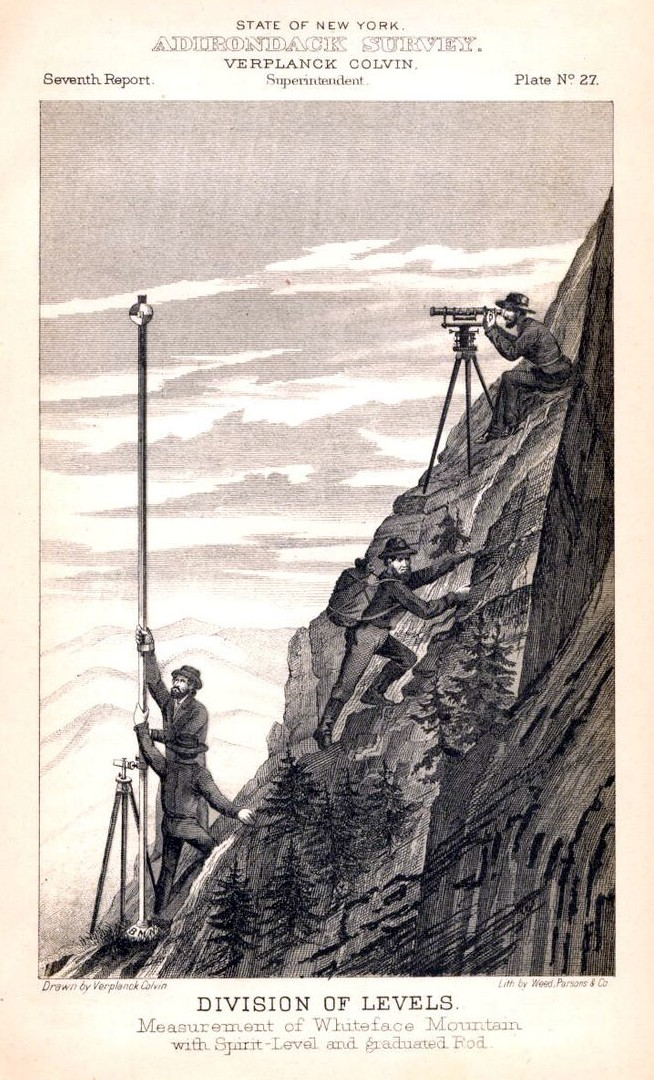
"Measurement of Whiteface Mountain with Spirit-Level and graduated Rod", drawn by Verplanck Colvin, published in the Seventh Report of the Adirondack Survey, 1881

In 1865, when he was 18, Alfred Billings Street gave Colvin a copy of his 1860 book, Woods and Waters, about his adventures in the Adirondack Mountains. The next three years, Colvin spent his summers exploring the Adirondack wilderness. By 1869, he had formed the idea of doing a geological survey of the Adirondack region. To gain experience, he recruited friend Mills Blake for a trip to nearby Helderberg Mountain. Colvin later wrote an illustrated report of the trip that was published in Harpers New Monthly Magazine, a national publication.

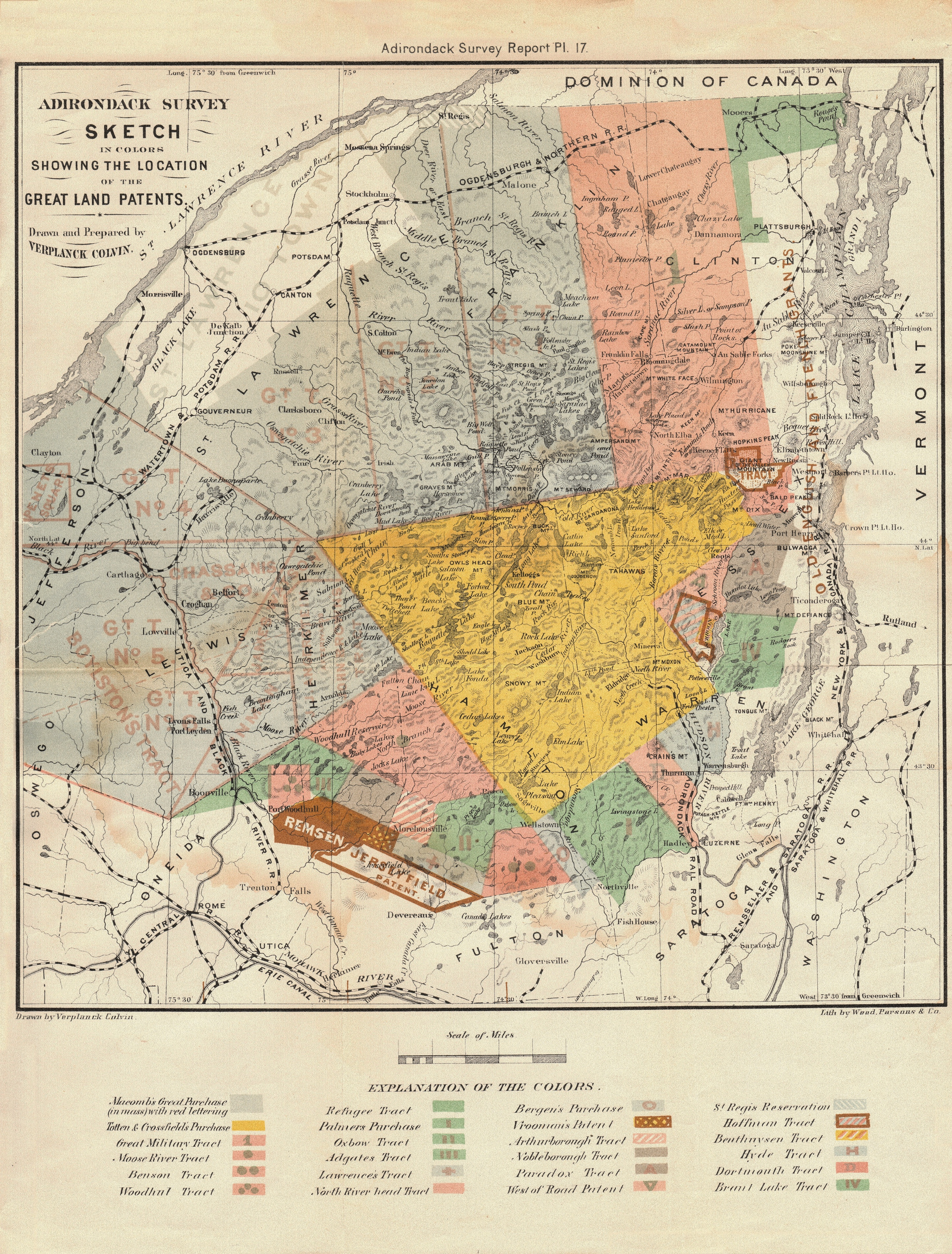
"Adirondack Survey Sketch by Verplanck Colvin, 1873.

During the summer of 1869 Colvin climbed Mount Marcy, and in 1870 he made the first recorded ascent of Seward Mountain. During the ascent of Seward, he saw the extensive damage being done by lumbermen in the Adirondacks. His report of the climb was read at the Albany Institute, where it garnered the attention of state officials, and was printed in the annual report of the New York State Museum of Natural History. In it, he tied clear-cutting of Adirondack forests to reduced water flow in the state's canals and rivers, an idea that had first appeared in George Perkins Marsh's Man and Nature, published in 1864.

In 1872 Colvin applied to New York for a stipend to cover the costs of a survey; he was subsequently named to the newly created post of Superintendent of the Adirondack Survey and given a $1000 budget by the state legislature to institute a survey of the Adirondacks. He was an able administrator and managed crews of up to 100 men separated by difficult terrain with only primitive communication methods. He also designed and built some tools for the job, including a folding canvas boat, and a wind powered spinning reflector to enable precise sighting of a mountain top from many miles away.

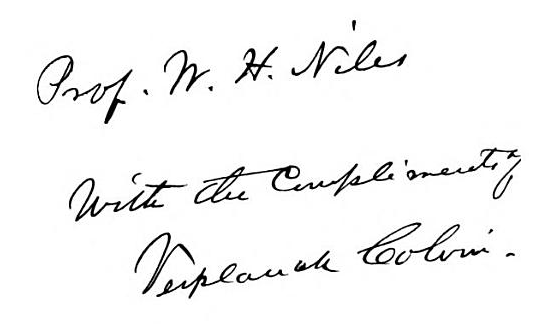
Inscription to Geology Professor W.H. Niles of the Massachusetts Institute of Technology by Verplanck Colvin on the first page of his Annual Report on the Progress of the Topographical Survey of the Adirondack Wilderness of New York for the Year 1873

During the first year the surveyors discovered Lake Tear-of-the-Clouds, often considered the source of the Hudson River. Colvin directed surveying parties throughout the Adirondacks and determined the altitudes of most of the highest peaks, becoming obsessed with his task. Determined to fix the precise altitude of Mount Marcy (having decided that the barometric method of determining altitude was insufficiently accurate) he established a series of 111 elevation benchmarks along the course of a forty mile trek from Westport on Lake Champlain to the summit of Marcy, each intermediate altitude being calculated to a precision of one-thousandth of a foot. As the crew approached the summit of Marcy, they encountered an October snow storm with ice and freezing rain; despite urging by his guides and assistants to wait for better weather, Colvin pushed on despite the danger of becoming trapped in Panther Gorge. At 4:50 PM on November 4, 1875, he took the final observation on the summit of Mt. Marcy and determined its elevation to be 5,344.311 feet above mean tide level in the Hudson. Upon his return to Panther Gorge later that evening, Colvin wrote "Joy reigned in the camp to-night, for we had accomplished the work in the face of the greatest difficulties; when the most experienced guide had ventured to say that it was for this season impossible. In honor of the event we had a choice supper of bear's meat fried, boiled and stewed, and hard bread and biscuit; then, unmindful of the snow storm beating in and around our open shanty, fell fast asleep."

In 1873 Colvin wrote a report arguing that if the Adirondack watershed was allowed to deteriorate, it would threaten the viability of the Erie Canal, which was then vital to New York's economy, and that the entire Adirondack region should therefore be protected by the creation of a state forest preserve. He was subsequently appointed superintendent of the New York state land survey, which led to the creation of the Adirondack Forest Preserve in 1885. His work ended in 1900 when then Governor Theodore Roosevelt transferred his duties to the state engineer. Mount Colvin in the Adirondacks was later named after him.

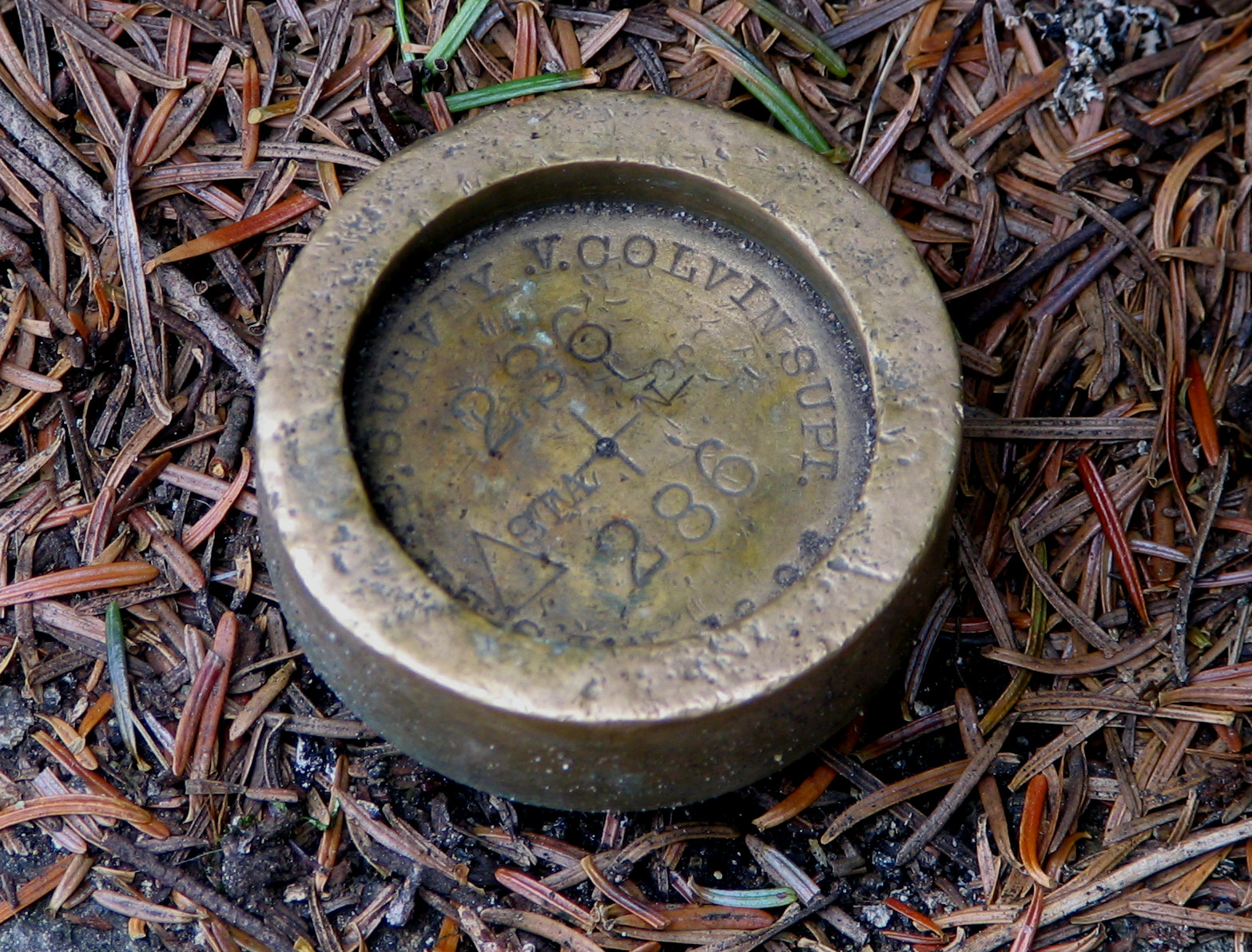
One of the surveyor's marks Colvin left on dozens of peaks in the Adirondacks, this one on Big Slide Mountain

Colvin was a member of numerous scientific societies and was president of the department of physical science at the Albany Institute. About 1881, at Hamilton College, he delivered lectures on geodesy, surveying, and topographical engineering. His maps, reports, illustrations and notes form a large part of the archives of the New York State Department of Environmental Conservation in Albany and are often referred to by present-day surveyors. In 1891, he ran on the Republican ticket for New York State Engineer and Surveyor but was defeated by Democrat Martin Schenck.

In addition to his Adirondack surveys, Colvin worked as a consulting engineer for several railroad projects. He was later the president of the Schenectady and Albany Railway Company and New York Canadian Pacific Railway Company.

Colvin died on May 28, 1920, in Troy, New York.

== Sources ==
- Goodwin, Tony, ed., Adirondack Trails, High Peaks Region, Lake George, New York: Adirondack Mountain Club, 2004. ISBN 1-931951-05-5
