= Adirondack Mountains =

Mountains in northeastern New York State, U.S.

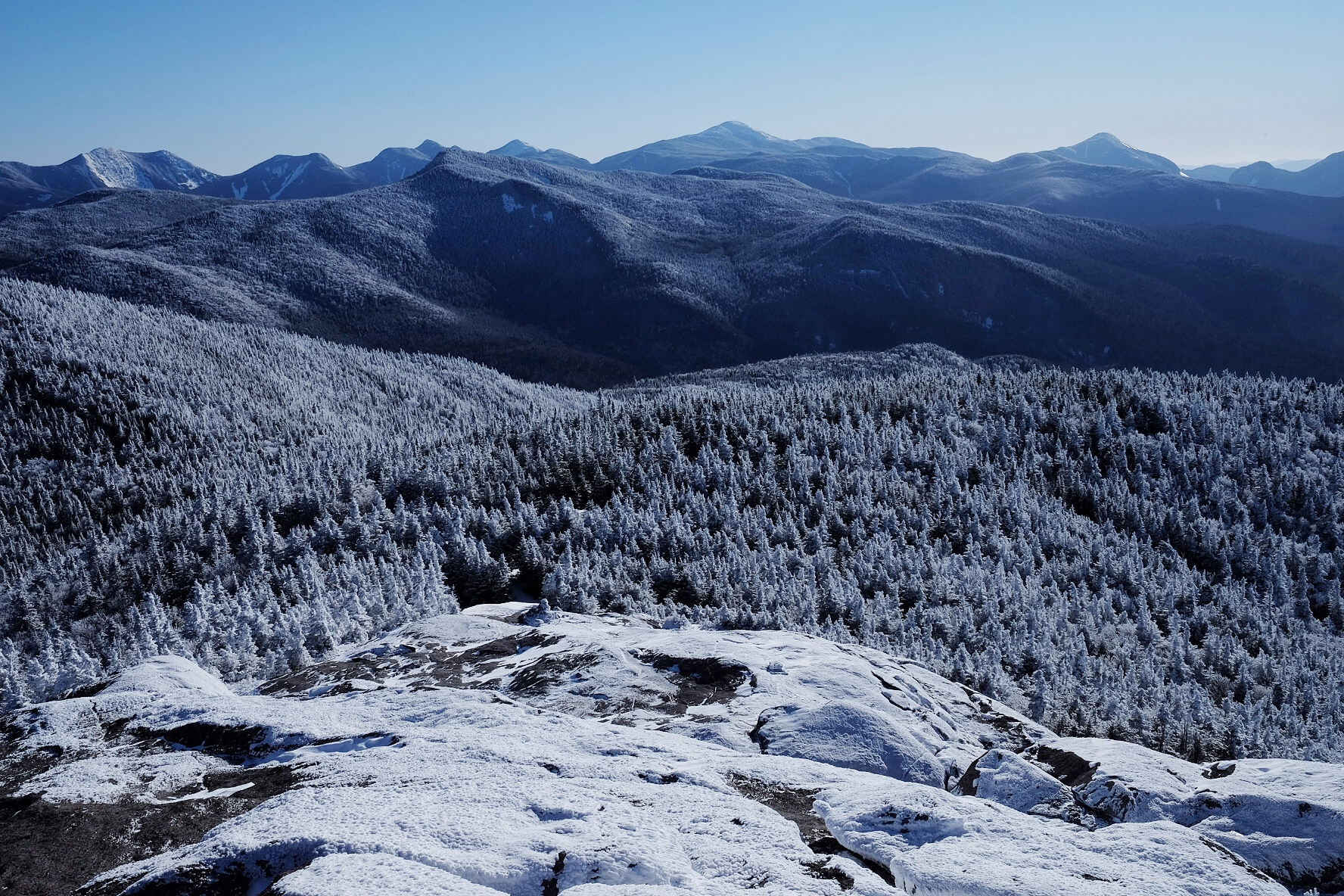
- The Adirondack Mountains seen in winter

Highest point
- Peak: Mount Marcy
- Elevation: 5,344 ft (1,629 m)
- Listing: Canadian Shield
- Coordinates: 44°06′45″N 73°55′26″W

Geography
- Country: United States
- State: New York

Geology
- Orogeny: Grenville Orogeny
- Rock age: Tonian

The Adirondack Mountains (/ˌædɪˈrɒn.dæk/ ad-i-RON-dak) are a massif of mountains in Northeastern New York State which form a circular dome approximately 160 miles (260 km) wide and covering about 5,000 square miles (13,000 km^{2}). The region contains more than 100 peaks, including Mount Marcy, which is the highest point in New York at 5,344 feet (1,629 m). The Adirondack High Peaks, a traditional list of 46 peaks over 4,000 feet (1,200 m), are popular hiking destinations. There are over 200 named lakes with the number of smaller lakes, ponds, and other bodies of water reaching over 3,000, amidst the thousands of square miles of Adirondack taiga boreal forest. Among the named lakes around the mountains are Lake George, Lake Placid, and Lake Tear of the Clouds. The region has over 1,200 miles (1,900 km) of rivers.

Although the mountains are formed from ancient rocks more than 1 billion years old, geologically, the mountains are relatively young and were created during recent periods of glaciation. Because of this, the Adirondacks have been referred to as "new mountains from old rocks". It is theorized that there is a hotspot beneath the region, which causes continued uplift at the rate of 0.06 to 0.12 inches (1.5 to 3 mm) annually.

The Adirondack mountain range has such unusual characteristics compared to the area around it that it is divided into its own province within the Appalachian Highlands physiographic division. It is bounded by three other provinces: the St. Lawrence (Champlain) on the north, northeast; the Appalachian Plateau to the south, southwest; and the Valley and Ridge to the southeast.

The entire region lies within Adirondack Park, a New York state protected area of over 6,000,000 acres (2,400,000 ha). The park was established in 1892 by the state legislature to protect the region's natural resources and to provide recreational opportunities for the public. It covers over 20 percent of New York state's land area.

== Etymology ==
The word Adirondack is thought to come from the Mohawk word atirǫ́·taks meaning "eaters of trees". The earliest written use of the name was in 1635 by Harmen Meyndertsz van den Bogaert in his Mohawk to Dutch glossary, found in his Journey into Mohawk Country. He spelled it Adirondakx and said that it stood for Frenchmen, meaning the Algonquians who allied with the French. Another early use of the name, spelled Rontaks, was in 1729 by French missionary Joseph-François Lafitau. He explained that the word was used by the Iroquoian peoples as a derogatory term for groups of Algonquians who did not practice agriculture and therefore sometimes had to eat tree bark to survive harsh winters.

The Mohawks had no written language, so Europeans used various phonetic spellings of the word, including Achkokx, Rondaxe, and Adirondax. Such words were strongly associated with the region, but they were not yet considered a place name; an English map from 1761 labels the area simply Deer Hunting Country. In 1838, the mountains were named Adirondacks by Ebenezer Emmons, the State Geologist for the northern New York State Geological District.

The Mohawks themselves referred to the mountains as Tsiiononteskowa, meaning 'big mountains'. The Oneida meanwhile, used the word Latilu·taks, which meant 'they're eating the trees/beaver'.

== History ==
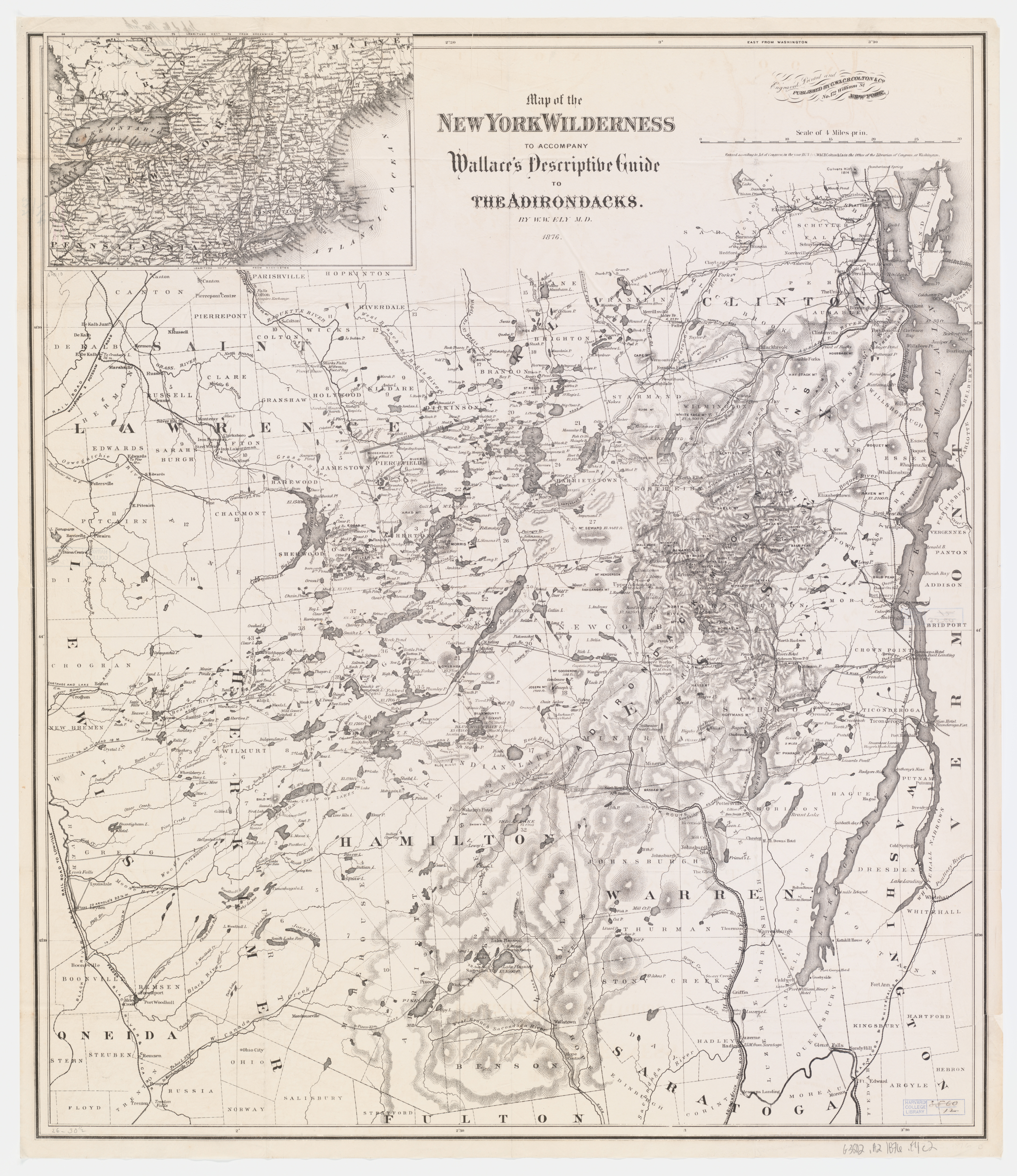
A 1876 map of the Adirondacks, showing many of the now obsolete names for many of the peaks, lakes, and communities

The first humans to live in the Adirondacks were Paleo-Indians who arrived around the 14th millennium BC following the end of the Last Glacial Period. The earliest migrants arrived from the St. Lawrence River Valley to the north, and settled along the shores of the Champlain Sea. During the Archaic Period (8000–1000 BC) this semi-nomadic hunter-gatherer Laurentian culture inhabited the Adirondacks; evidence of their presence includes a projectile point of red-brown chert found in 2007 at the edge of Tupper Lake.

During an interval of roughly 11,000 years following the end of the Last Glacial Period, the climate of the Adirondacks gradually warmed, with the area's tundra being replaced by forests that were now able to grow. During the transition between the Archaic and Woodland (1000 BC – AD 1000) periods, multiple different groups replaced the Laurentian culture—including the Sylvan Lake, River, Middlesex, Point Peninsula, and Owasco cultures. By the time of the Owasco culture c. 1 AD, maize and beans were being cultivated in the uplands of the Adirondacks.

The easternmost Haudenosaunee, the Mohawk (or Kanienʼkehá꞉ka) and the Oneida (or Onʌyoteˀa·ká·), arrived in the Adirondack region between 4,000 and 1,200 years ago. Both groups claimed the Adirondack Mountains as hunting grounds. According to Haudenosaunee historian Rick Hill, the region was considered a 'Dish with One Spoon,' symbolizing shared hunting resources between the groups. A group of Algonquian people, known as the Mohicans, also occupied the region, particularly the Hudson River Valley.

These were the groups that the first European explorers of the area encountered. European presence in the area began with a battle between Samuel de Champlain and a group of Mohawks, in what is now Ticonderoga in 1609. The Jesuit missionary Isaac Jogues became the first recorded European to travel through the center of the Adirondacks, as the captive of a Mohawk hunting party, in 1642.

The early European perception of the Adirondacks was of a vast, inhospitable wilderness. One map of the area from 1771 shows the region as a blank space in the northeastern corner of New York. In 1784, Thomas Pownhall wrote that the Native Americans referred to the area as "the Dismal Wilderness, or the Habitation of Winter," and that the area was "either not much known to them, or, if known, very wisely by them kept from the Knowledge of the Europeans". He clearly had the impression that native people did not live within the Adirondack mountains.

Because local Haudenosaunee and Algonquian tribes had been decimated first by smallpox and measles in the 1600s, then by wars with encroaching European settlers, there likely were very few people living in the region by the time Pownhall wrote his description. It is only relatively recently that numerous archaeological finds have definitively shown that Native Americans were indeed very present in the Adirondacks before European contact, hunting, making pottery, and practicing agriculture.

The European impression of a wild region devoid of human connection set up a narrative about wilderness that would persist through the next 200-some years of the region's history. While society's perception of the Adirondacks' value changed, they were always seen as a land of natural resources and physical beauty, not of human history. First the area was an inhospitable tangle, then a lucrative store of lumber. After the American Revolutionary War, New York State gained ownership of most of the land in the region.

Needing money to discharge war debts, the government sold nearly all the original public acreage about 7 million acres for pennies an acre. Lumbermen were welcomed to the interior, with few restraints, resulting in massive deforestation. Later, the wilderness character of the region became popular with the rise of the Romantic movement, and the Adirondacks became a destination for those wishing to escape the evils of city life. Rising concern over water quality and deforestation led to the creation of the Adirondack Park in 1885. In 1989, part of the Adirondack region was designated by UNESCO as the Champlain-Adirondack Biosphere Reserve.

For the more recent human history of the Adirondack region, see Adirondack Park.

== Geology ==
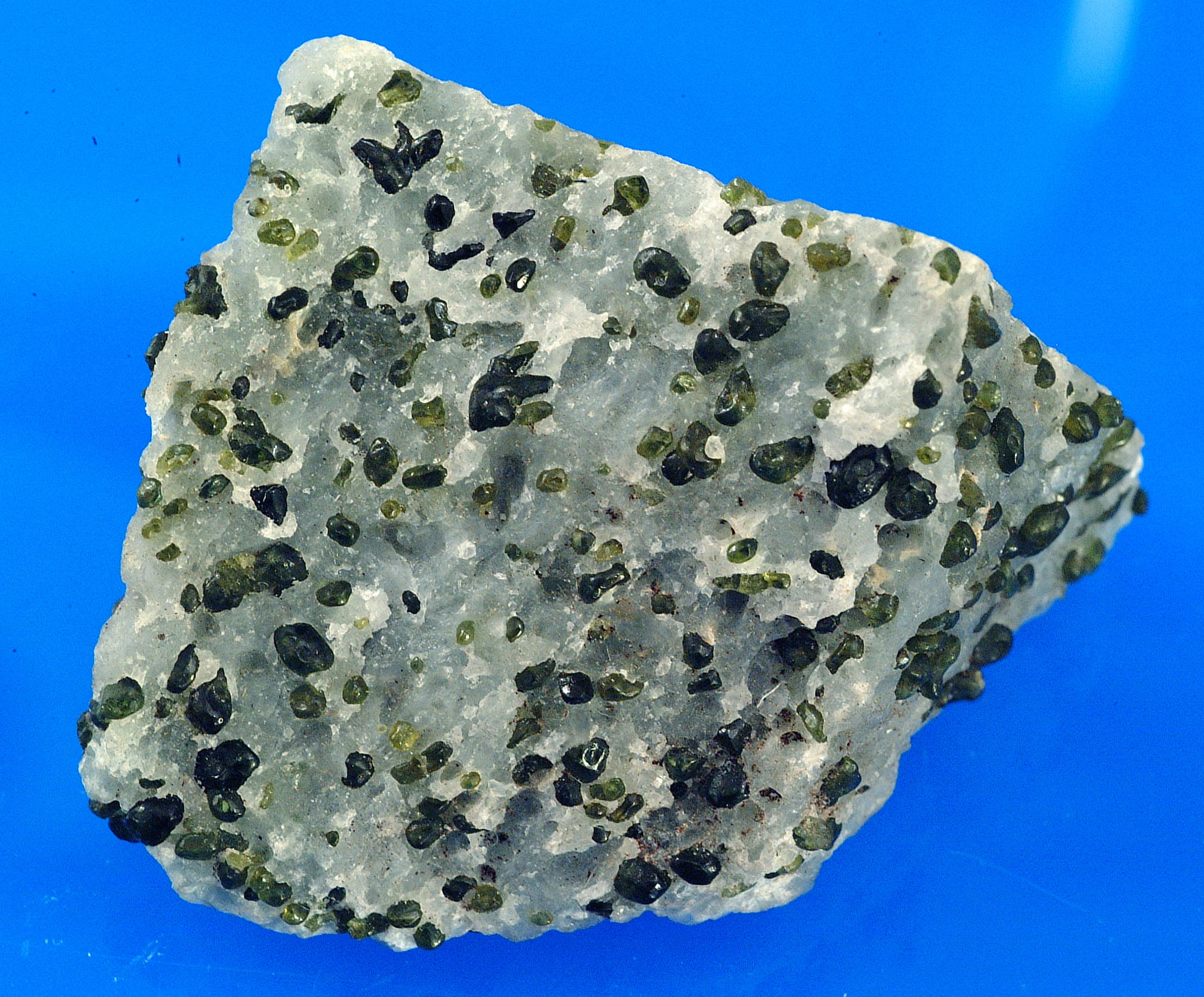
Green diopside and gray/white calcite in marble from the Adirondack Mountains

The rocks of the Adirondack mountains originated about two billion years ago as 50,000-foot (15,000 m) thick sediments at the bottom of a sea located near the equator. Because of plate tectonics, these collided with Laurentia (the precursor of modern North America) in a mountain-building episode known as the Grenville orogeny. During this time the sedimentary rock was changed into metamorphic rock. It is these Proterozoic minerals and lithologies that make up the core of the massif. Rocks and minerals of interest include these:

- wollastonite, mined near Harrisville
- magnetite and hematite, formerly mined at the Benson Mines, Lyon Mountain, Mineville, Tahawus, and Witherbee
- graphite, mined near Hague and Ticonderoga
- garnet, mined at the Barton Mine, north of Gore Mountain
- anorthosite, visible in road cuts on the New York State Route 3 between Saranac Lake and Tupper Lake
- marble
- zinc; the Balmat-Edwards district on the northwest flank of the massif also in St. Lawrence County was a major zinc ore deposit
- titanium, mined at Tahawus

The Adirondacks are thought to be uplifted by a hot spot in the Canadian Shield, in contrast to other mountain ranges in New York which were created in the Alleghenian Orogeny and are a part of the Appalachian chain (not to be confused with the cultural region of Appalachia).

Around 600 million years ago, as Laurentia drifted away from Baltica (European Craton), the area began to be pulled apart, forming the Iapetus Ocean. Faults developed, running north to northeast, which formed valleys and deep lakes. Examples visible today include the grabens Lake George and Schroon Lake. By this time the Grenville mountains had been eroded away and the area was covered by a shallow sea. Several thousand feet of sediment accumulated on the sea bed. Trilobites were the principal life-form of the sea bed, and fossil tracks can be seen in the Potsdam sandstone floor of the Paul Smiths Visitor Interpretive Center.

About 10 million years ago, the region began to be uplifted. It has been lifted about 7,000 feet (2,000 m) and is continuing at about 0.08 inches (2 mm) per year, which is greater than the rate of denudation. The cause of the uplift is unknown, but geologists theorize that it is caused by a hot spot in the Earth's crust. A recent study has revealed a column of seismically slow materials about 30 to 50 miles (50 to 80 km) deep beneath the Adirondack Mountains, which was interpreted to be the upwelling asthenosphere contributing to the uplift of the mountains. The occurrence of earthquake swarms near the center of the massif at Blue Mountain Lake may be evidence of this. Some of the earthquakes have exceeded 5 on the Richter magnitude scale.

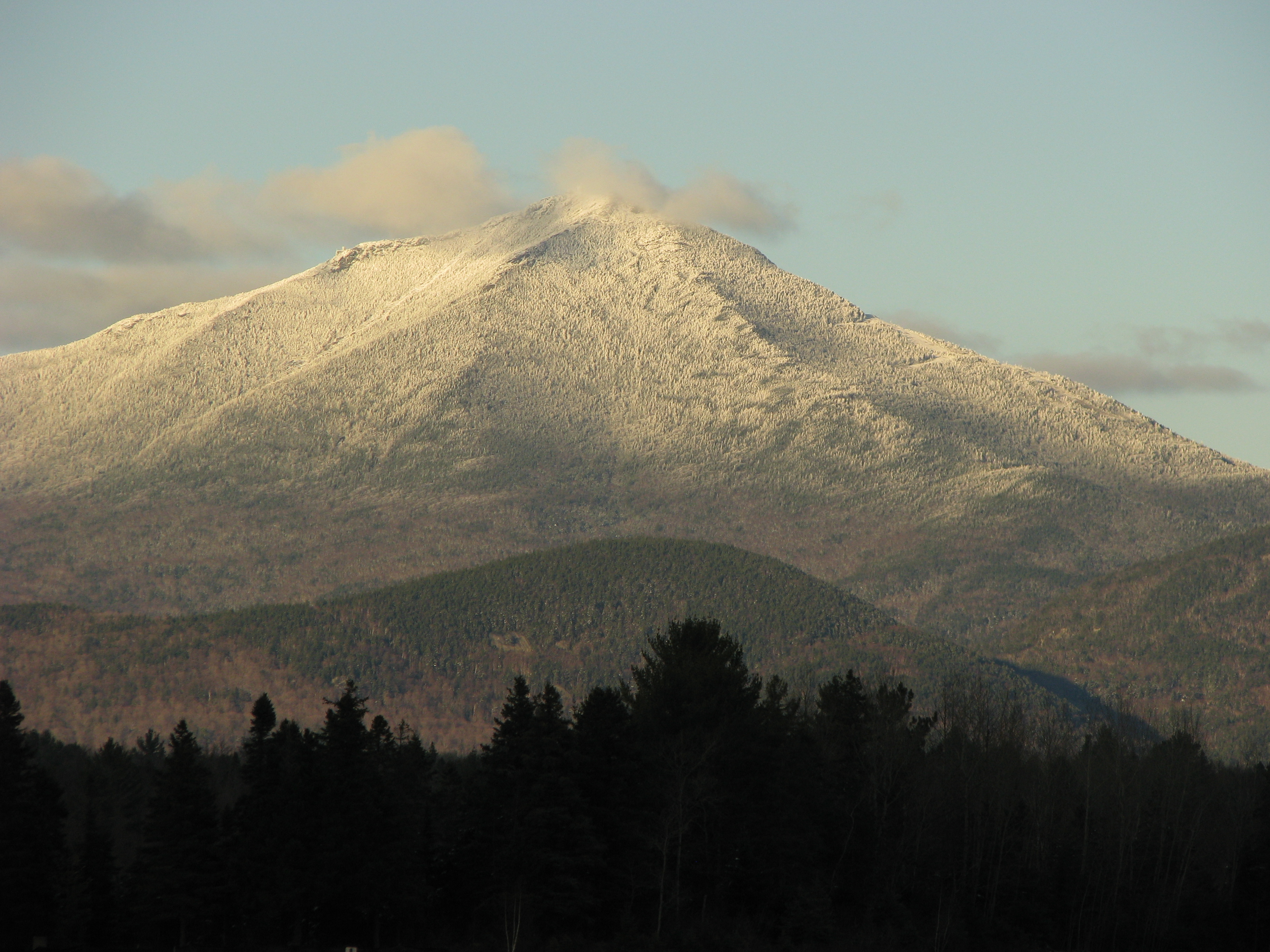
Whiteface Mountain (1,483 m or 4,867 ft) is the fifth-highest mountain in New York, and one of the High Peaks of the Adirondack Mountains.

Starting about 2.5 million years ago, a cycle of Pleistocene glacial and interglacial periods began which covered the area in ice. During the most recent episode, the Laurentide Ice Sheet covered most of northern North America between about 95,000 and 20,000 years ago. After this the climate warmed, but it took nearly 10,000 years for a 10,000-foot (3,000 m) thick layer of ice to completely melt. Evidence of this period includes:

- Eskers: the Rainbow Lake esker bisects the eponymous lake and extends discontinuously for 85 miles (137 km). Another long discontinuous esker extends from Mountain Pond through Keese Mill, passing between Upper St. Regis Lake and the Spectacle Ponds, and continuing to Ochre, Fish, and Lydia Ponds in the St. Regis Canoe Area. A 150-foot (50 m) high esker bisects the Five Ponds Wilderness Area.
- Glacial erratics: there is a large one at the Newcomb Visitor Information Center next to the Rich Lake Trail.
- Kames
- Moraines
- The cirques that characterize Whiteface Mountain.
- Outwash plains: St. Regis Canoe Area is an outwash plain pitted with kettle holes.

Soils in the area are generally thin, sandy, acidic, and infertile, having developed since the glacial retreat.

== Climate ==
The climate is strongly continental, with high humidity and precipitation year-round. The Adirondacks typically experience pleasantly warm, rainy weather in the summer (June–August), with temperatures in the range of 66–73 °F (19–23 °C), cooler than the rest of New York State due to the higher elevation. Summer evenings in the Adirondacks are chilly, with temperatures ranging on average between 45–54 °F (7–12 °C). Winters (December–March) are long, cold, snowy and harsh, with temperatures ranging from 18 to 23 °F (−8 to −5 °C). Winter nights are frigid, with temperatures between −2 and 4 °F (−19 and −16 °C). Spring (April–May) and fall (September–November) are short transitional seasons.

Climate data for Lake Placid, NY. Elevation: 2,054 ft (626 m)
Month	Jan	Feb	Mar	Apr	May	Jun	Jul	Aug	Sep	Oct	Nov	Dec	Year
Mean daily maximum °F (°C)	23.4 (−4.8)	24.6 (−4.1)	30.7 (−0.7)	44.8 (7.1)	60.5 (15.8)	67.9 (19.9)	71.6 (22.0)	70.6 (21.4)	63.7 (17.6)	50.3 (10.2)	40.1 (4.5)	30.6 (−0.8)	50.3 (10.2)
Daily mean °F (°C)	17.5 (−8.1)	20.6 (−6.3)	25.0 (−3.9)	38.4 (3.6)	49.9 (9.9)	58.4 (14.7)	62.3 (16.8)	61.3 (16.3)	54.7 (12.6)	44.1 (6.7)	34.5 (1.4)	23.4 (−4.8)	41.4 (5.2)
Mean daily minimum °F (°C)	2.9 (−16.2)	3.7 (−15.7)	15.9 (−8.9)	27.9 (−2.3)	38.9 (3.8)	48.9 (9.4)	52.9 (11.6)	52.0 (11.1)	44.7 (7.1)	32.6 (0.3)	24.7 (−4.1)	13.9 (−10.1)	32.4 (0.2)
Average precipitation inches (mm)	4.56 (116)	3.98 (101)	5.31 (135)	5.40 (137)	5.59 (142)	5.79 (147)	6.13 (156)	5.29 (134)	6.22 (158)	6.97 (177)	5.83 (148)	5.22 (133)	66.29 (1,684)
Average relative humidity (%)	71.1	66.2	62.4	60.1	63.8	70.4	70.8	72.8	73.0	70.7	69.9	72.0	68.6
Average dew point °F (°C)	10.7 (−11.8)	11.1 (−11.6)	16.8 (−8.4)	26.5 (−3.1)	38.3 (3.5)	48.8 (9.3)	52.7 (11.5)	52.5 (11.4)	46.2 (7.9)	35.2 (1.8)	25.7 (−3.5)	15.7 (−9.1)	31.7 (−0.2)
Source: PRISM Climate Group

== Ecology ==
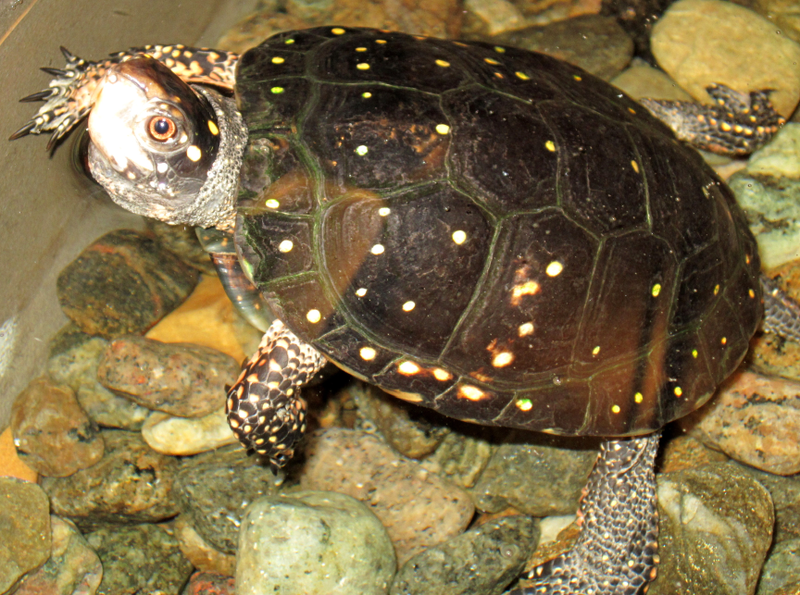
A spotted turtle at the Wild Center

The Adirondack Mountains form the southernmost part of the Eastern forest-boreal transition ecoregion. They are heavily forested, and contain one of the southernmost distributions of the taiga ecotype in North America. The forests of the Adirondacks include spruce, pine and deciduous trees. Lumbering, once an important industry, has been much restricted by the creation of state forest preserve.

The mountains include many wetlands, of which there are three kinds:

- swamps, any wetland including trees and shrubs.
- marshes, wetlands with water stagnation. These may support bullfrogs, spring peepers, spotted salamanders, great blue herons, American bitterns, and painted turtles. Pickerel weed often forms large colonies.
- bogs, characterized by plants like sphagnum moss, orchids, and pitcher plants.

Breeding birds include northern forest specialists not found anywhere else in the state, such as boreal chickadees, Canada jays, spruce grouse, black-backed woodpeckers, common loons and crossbills. Mammals include raccoons, beavers, river otters, bobcats, moose, black bears, and coyotes. Extirpated or extinct mammals that formerly roamed the Adirondacks include the eastern cougar, eastern elk, wolverine, caribou, eastern wolf, and the Canada lynx. Attempted reintroductions of elk and lynx in the 20th century failed for numerous reasons, including poaching, vehicle collisions, and conservation incompetence.

Nearly 60 percent of the park is covered with northern hardwood forest. Above 2,600 feet (790 meters), conditions are too poor for hardwoods to thrive, and the trees become mixed with or replaced by balsam fir and red spruce. Above 3,500 feet (1,100 meters) black spruce replace red. Higher still, only trees short enough to be covered in snow during the winter can survive.

A small area on the highest peaks exists above the tree line and has an alpine climate. These areas are covered by plants which occupied a large lowland tundra following the most recent period of glaciation. The amount of area covered by this ecosystem changes from year to year due to local climate changes, and has been estimated to only cover between 65–85 acres (26–34 hectares). The alpine ecosystem is considered extremely fragile, and was damaged by hikers prior to a 1970s campaign by the Adirondack Mountain Club to preserve it.

Scenes from the Adirondacks
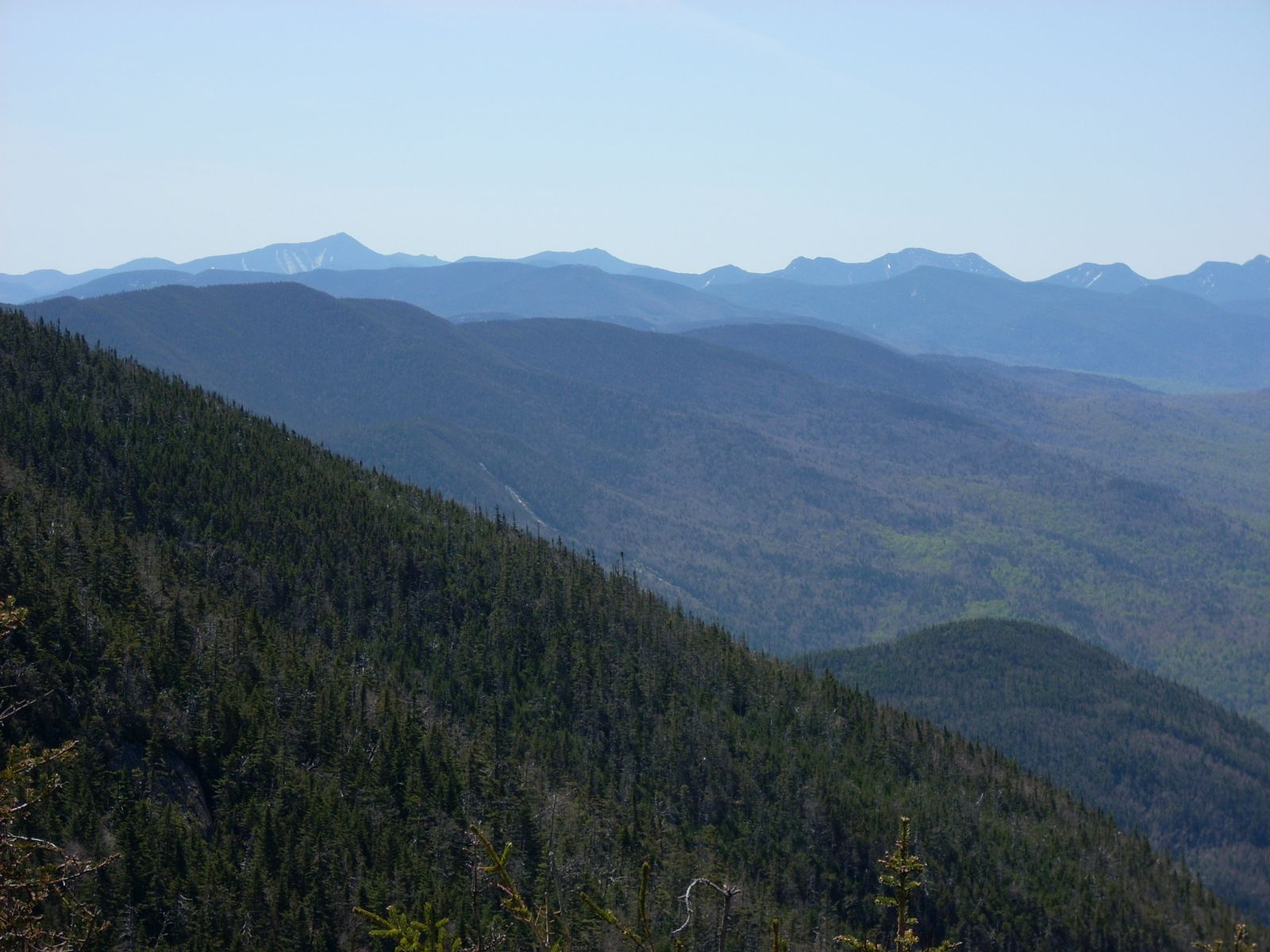
The Adirondack Mountains of Upstate New York form the southernmost zone in the Eastern forest-boreal transition ecoregion of North America

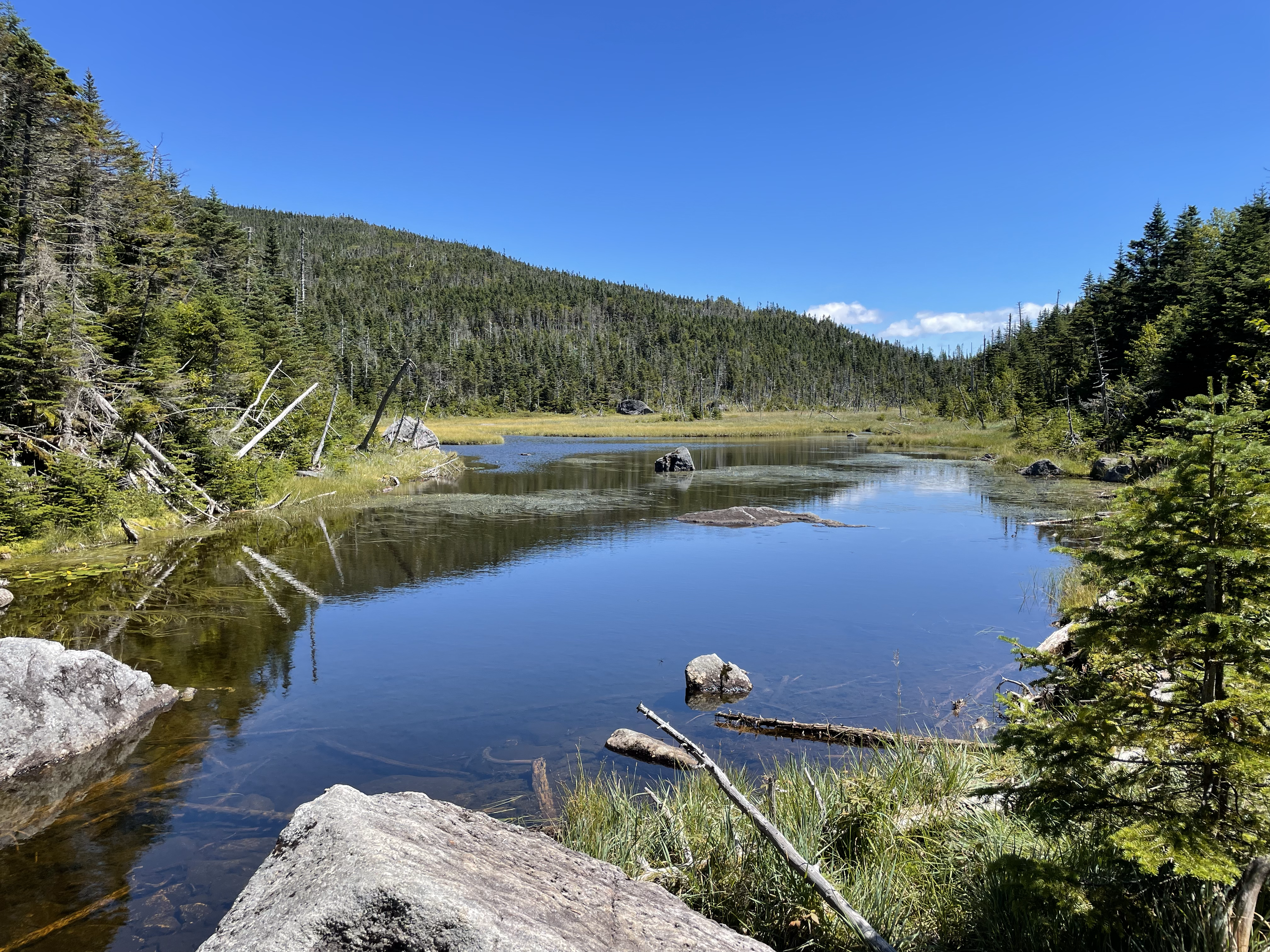
The hydrologic source of the Hudson River is near or at Lake Tear of the Clouds, a small tarn in the Adirondacks.

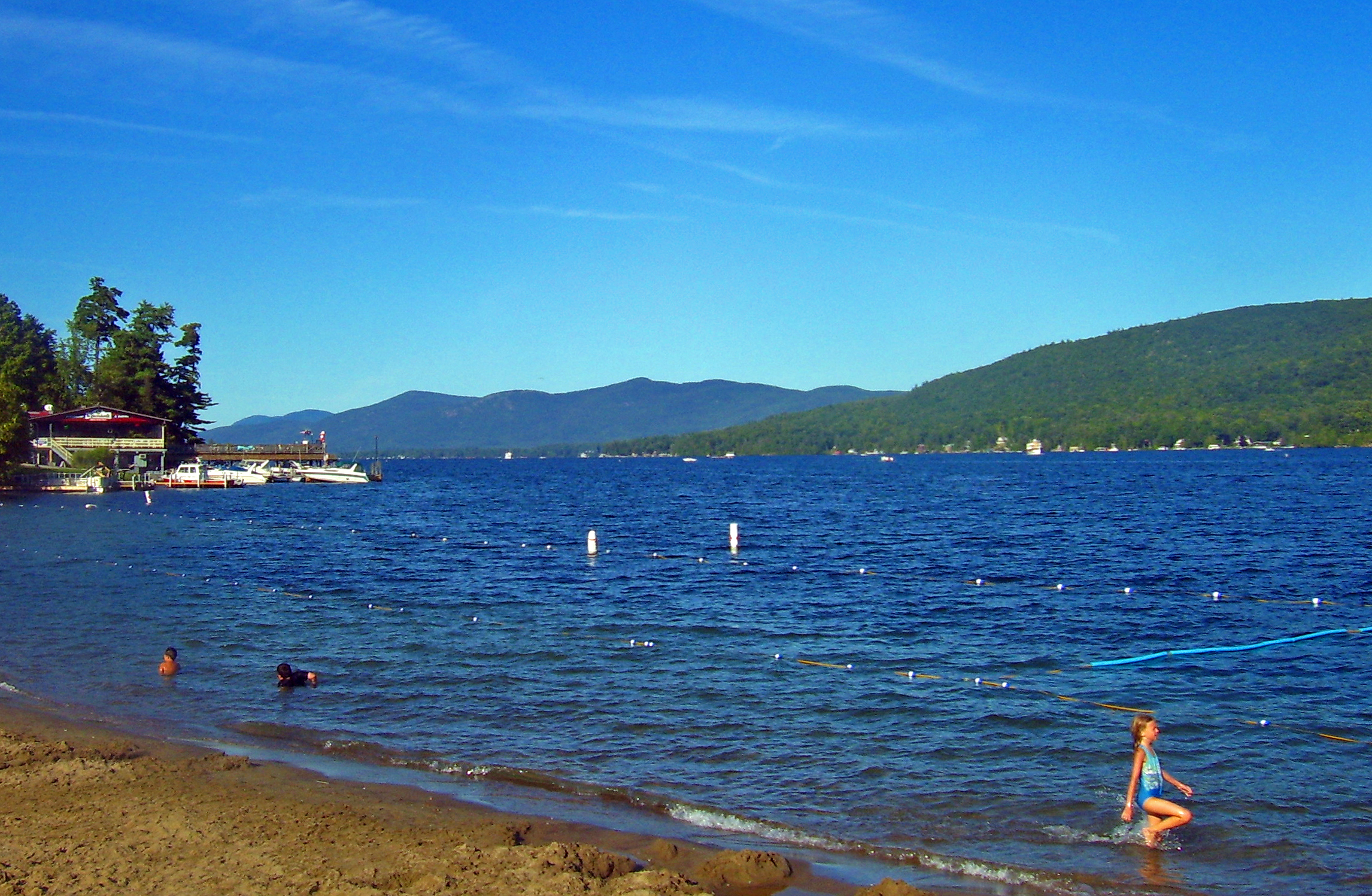
Lake George, one of numerous oligotrophic lakes in the Adirondack region, is nicknamed the Queen of American Lakes.

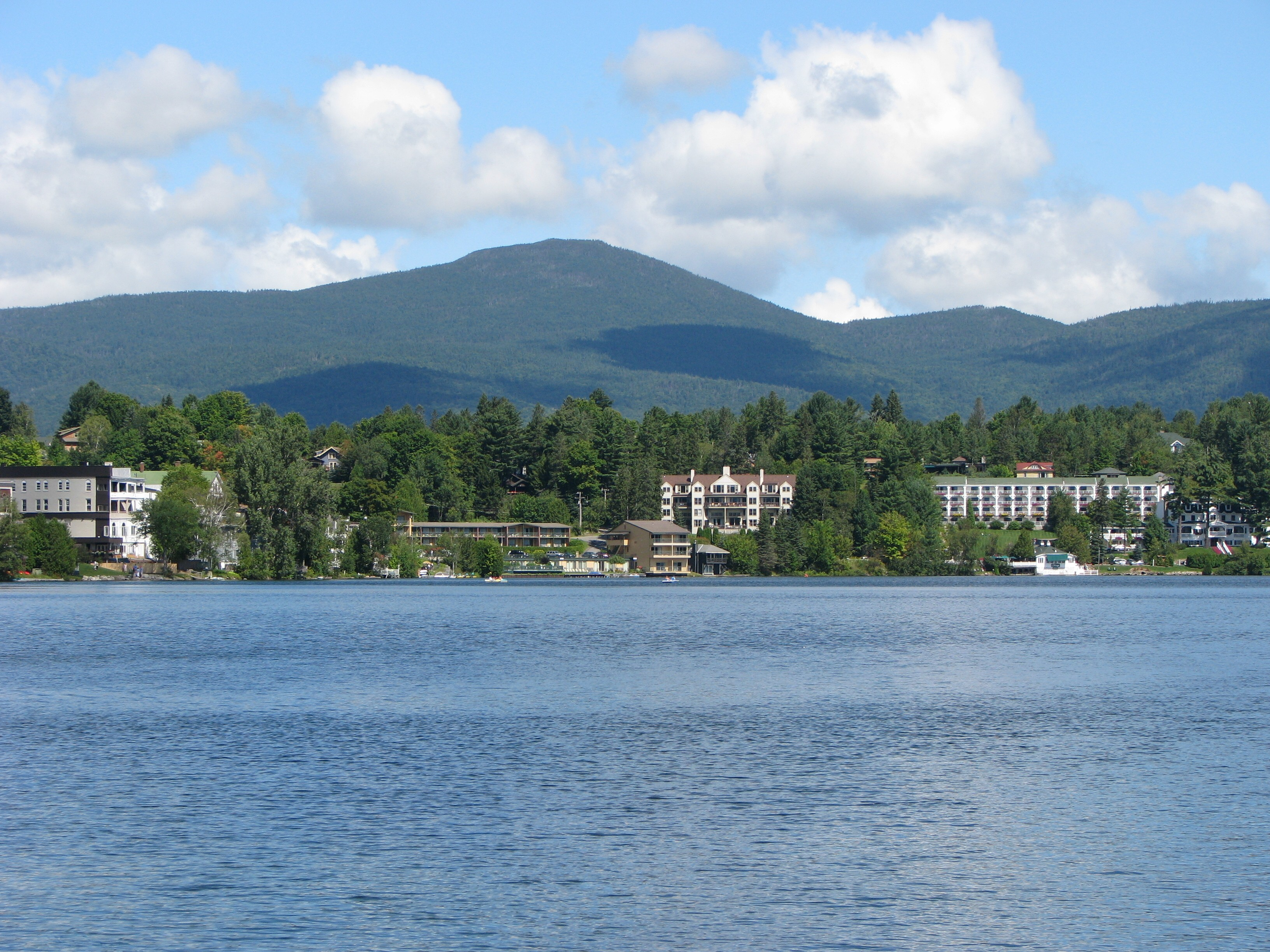
Mirror Lake in the Village of Lake Placid in the Adirondacks, site of the 1932 and the 1980 Winter Olympics

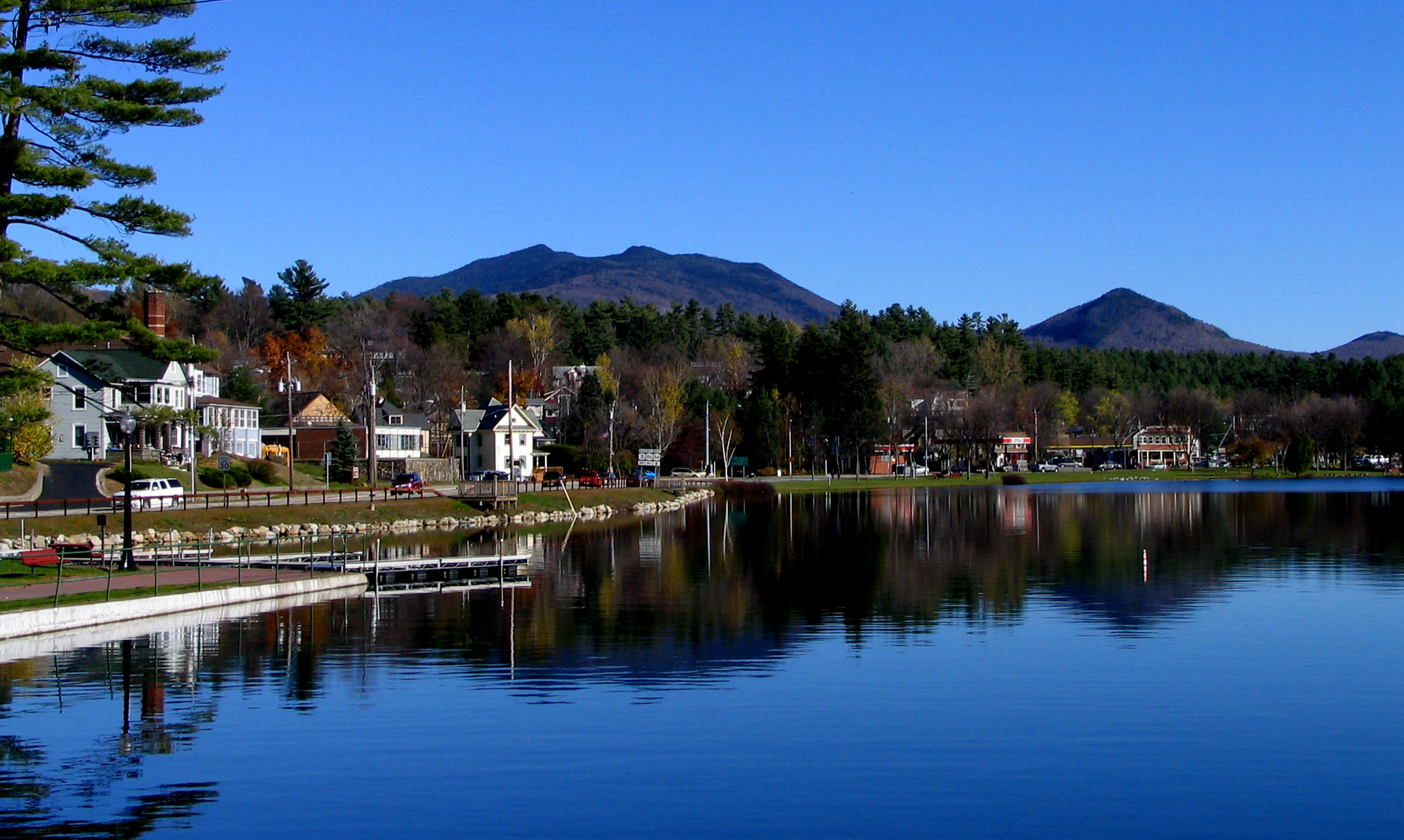
Lake Flower in the Village of Saranac Lake, nicknamed the Capital of the Adirondacks

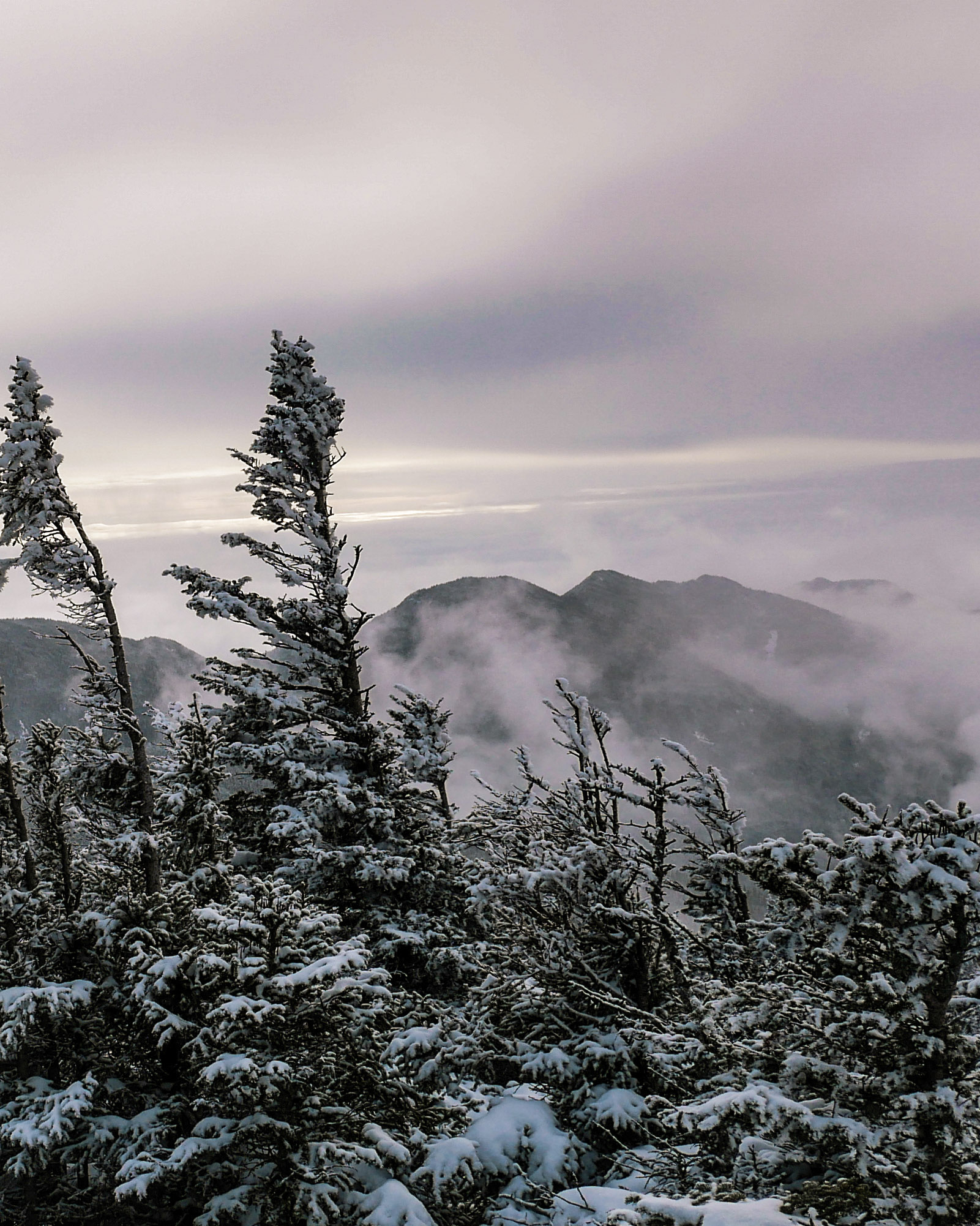
View of Mount Colvin and Nippletop from the ascent to Gothics

== Art depicting the Adirondacks ==
Art depicting the Adirondacks
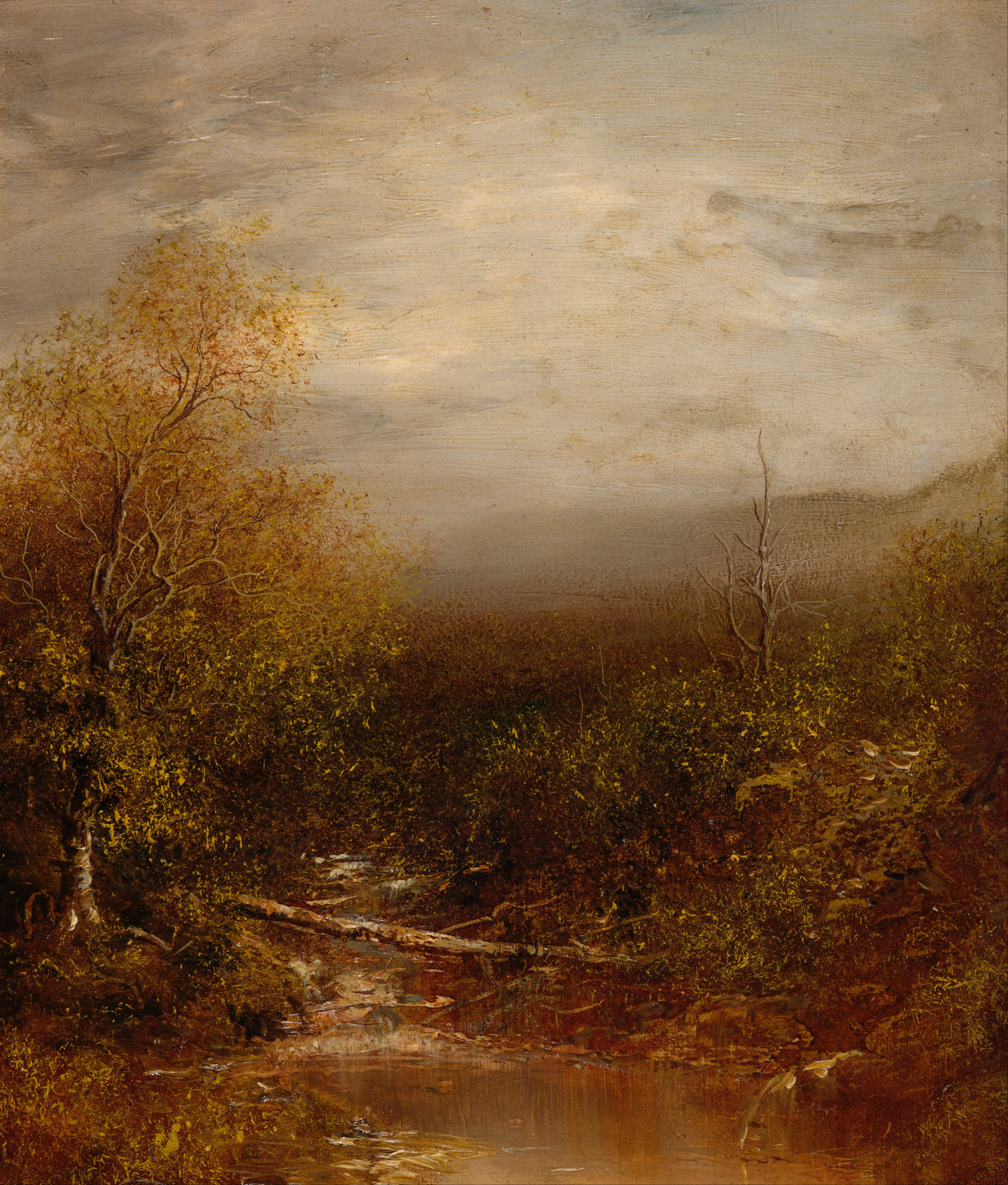
Pool in the Adirondacks (1875-1878) by Ralph Albert Blakelock

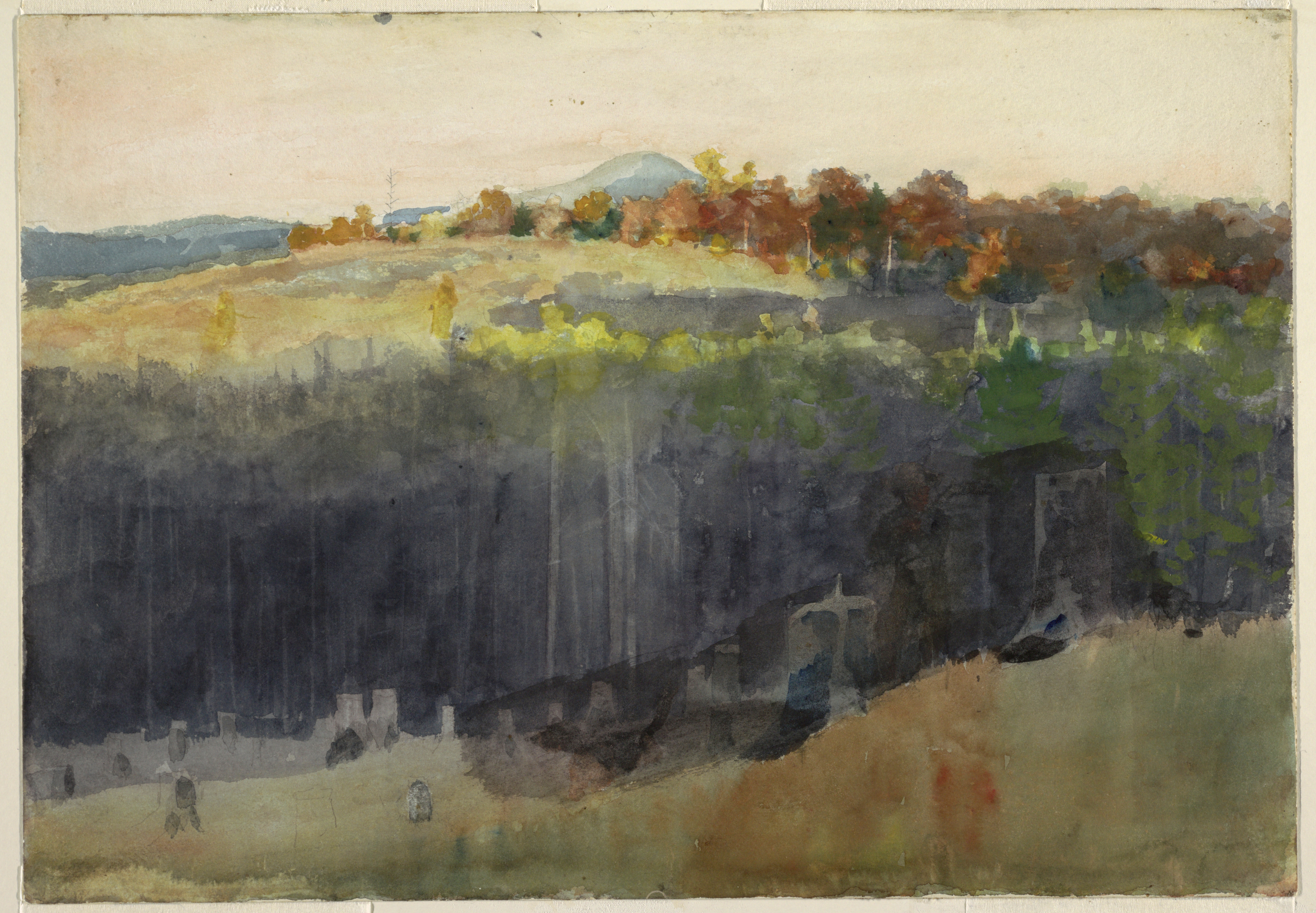
Valley and Hillside, Adirondacks (1889–94) by Frederic Edwin Church

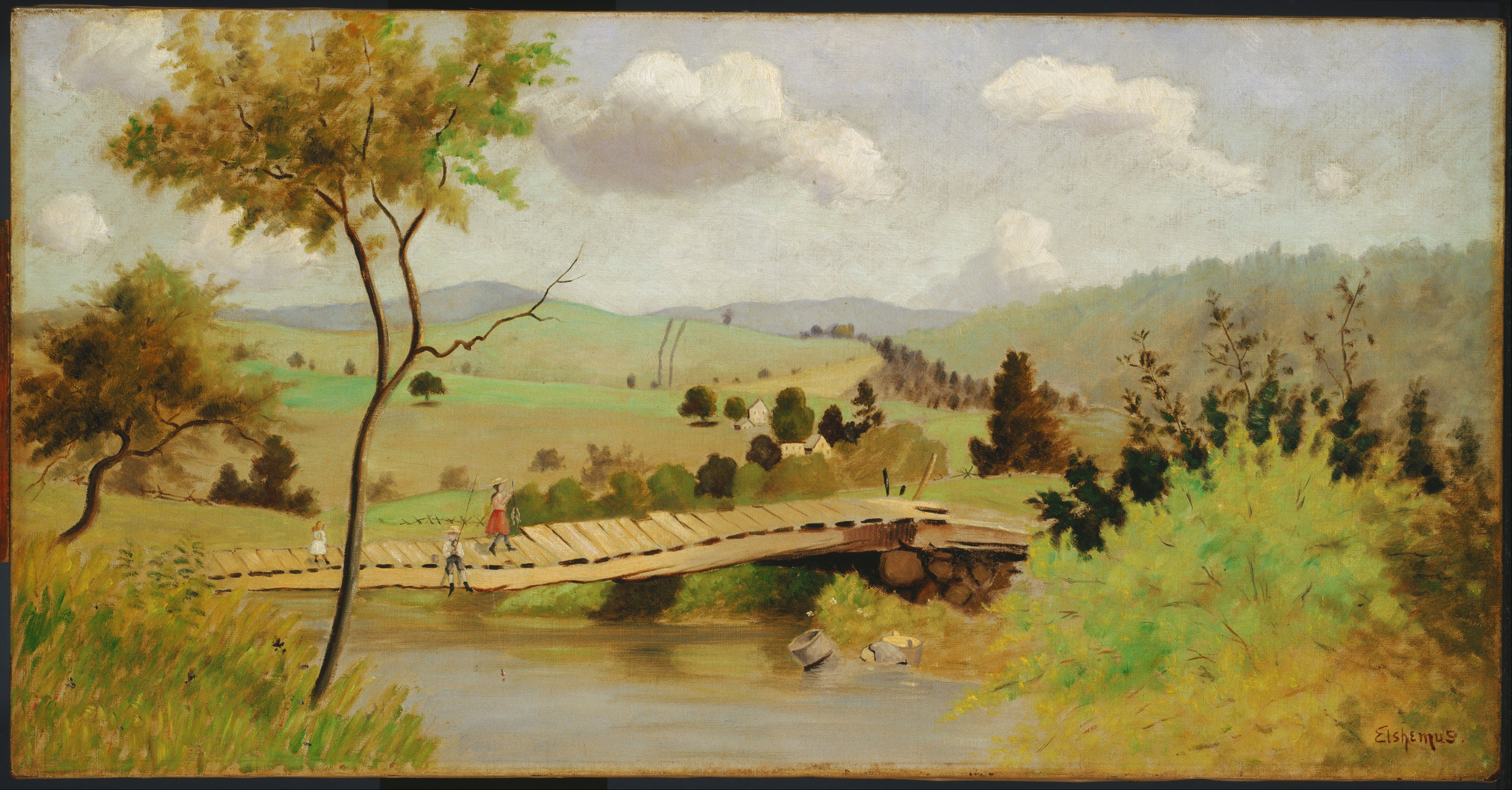
Adirondacks- Bridge for Fishing (1897) by Louis Michel Eilshemius

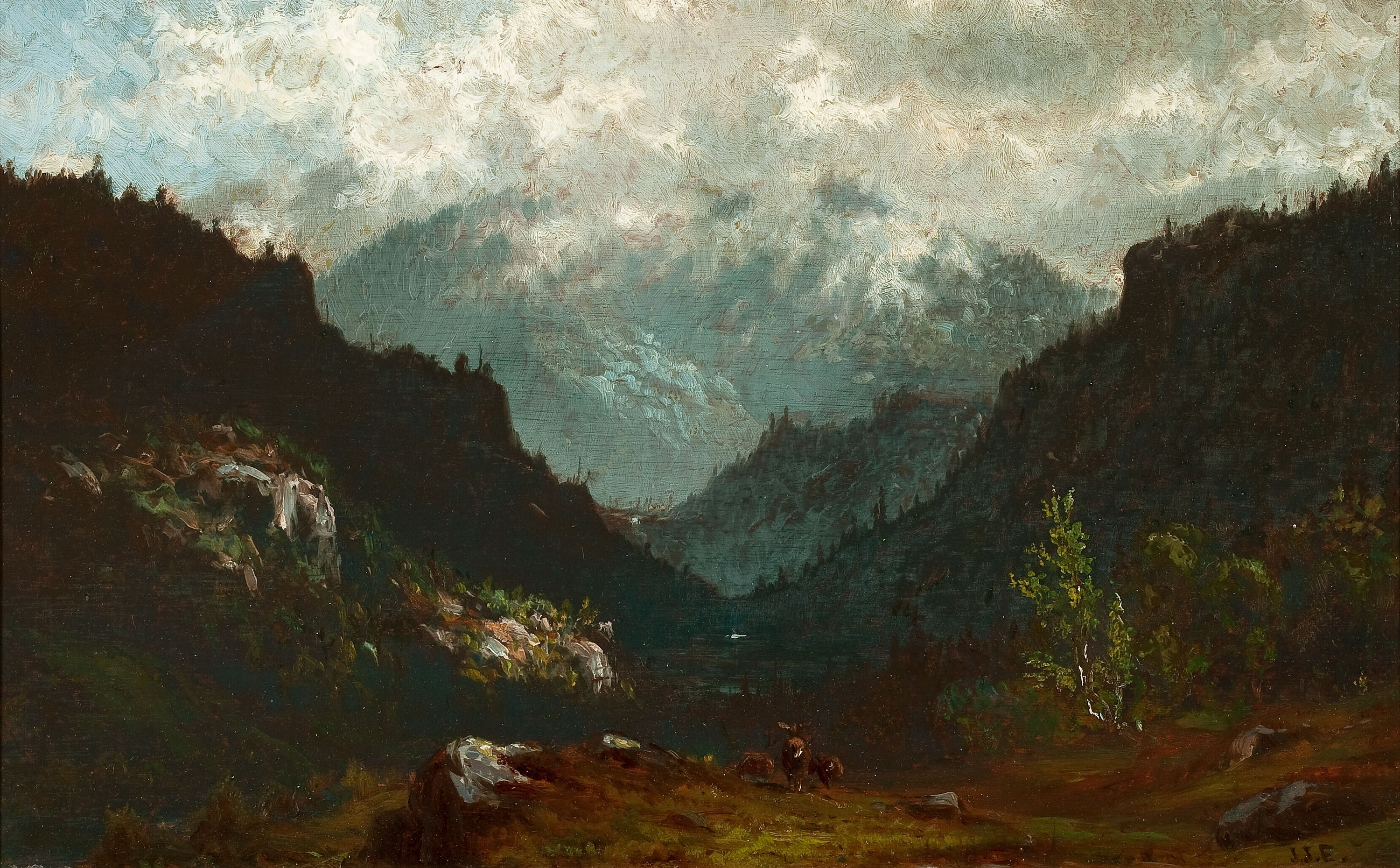
Wilmington Pass, Adirondacks by John Joseph Enneking

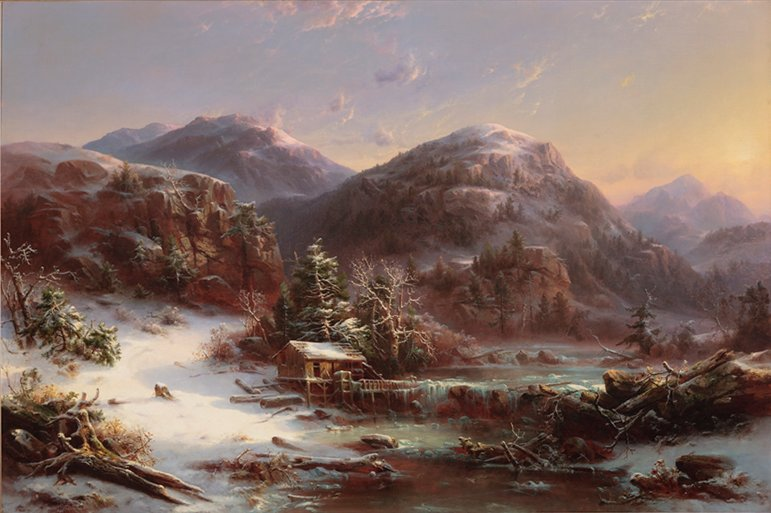
Winter in the Mountains (Winter in the Adirondacks) (1853) by Régis François Gignoux

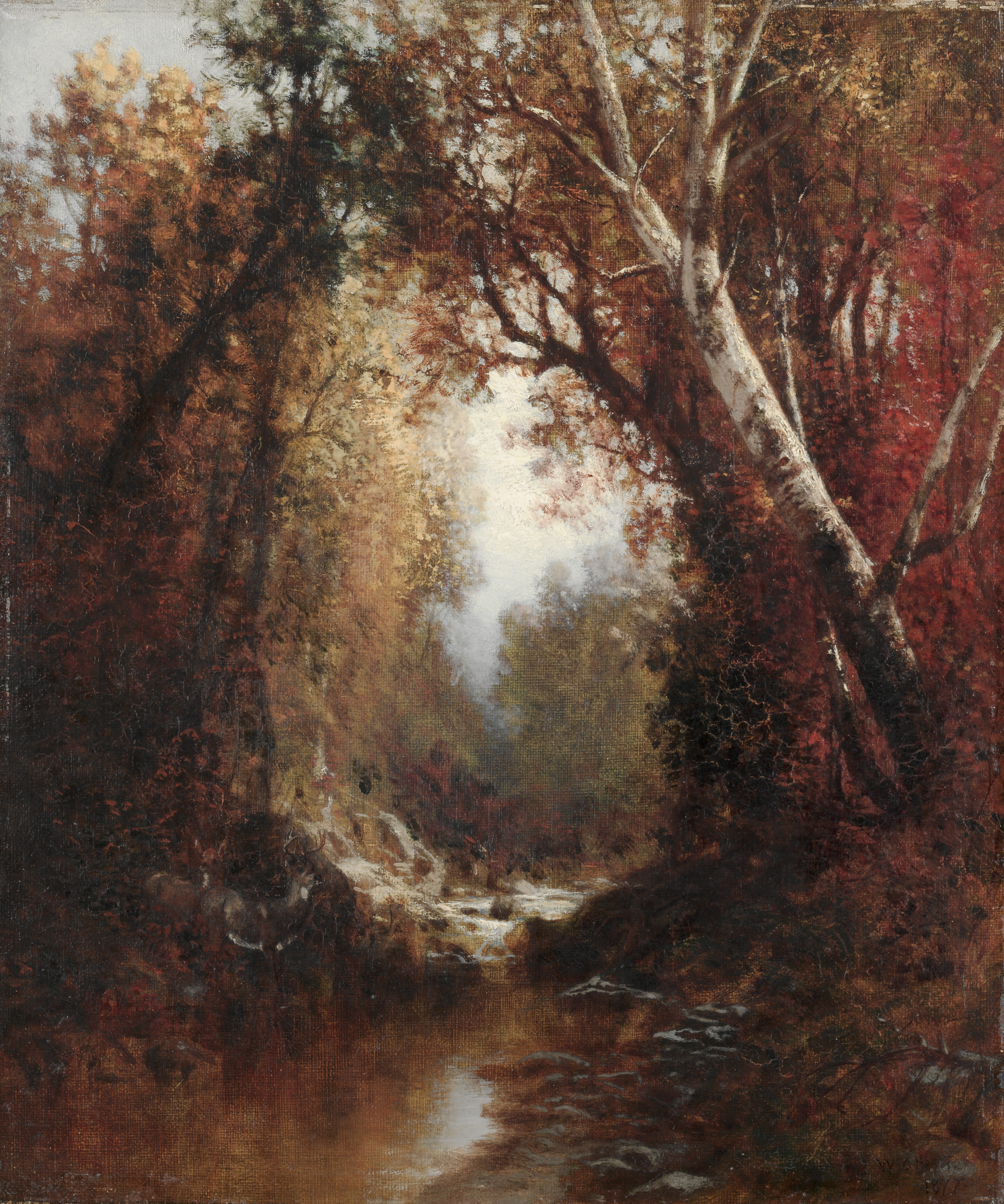
Autumn Scene in the Adirondacks (1877) by William Hart

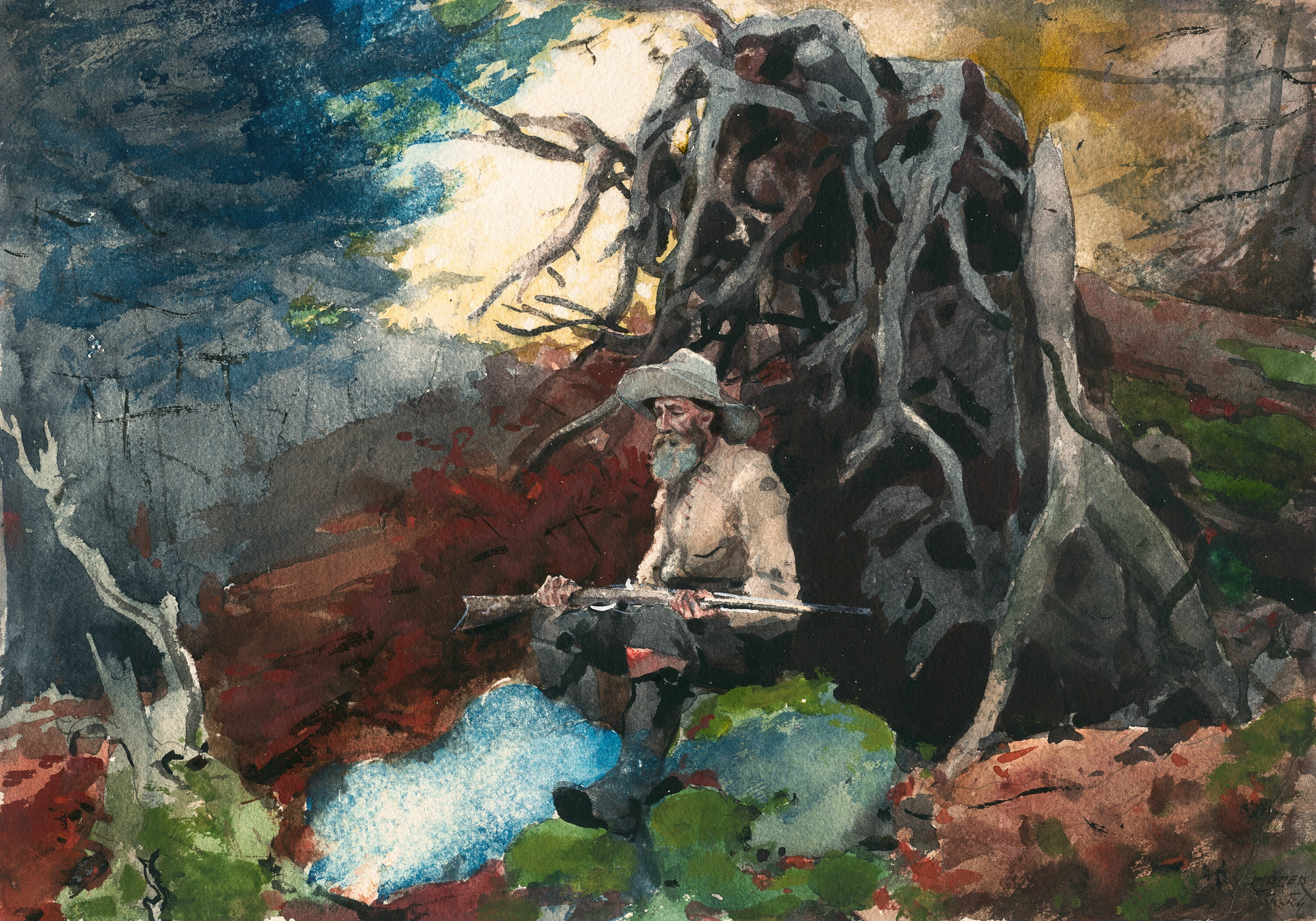
Campfire, Adirondacks (1892) by Winslow Homer

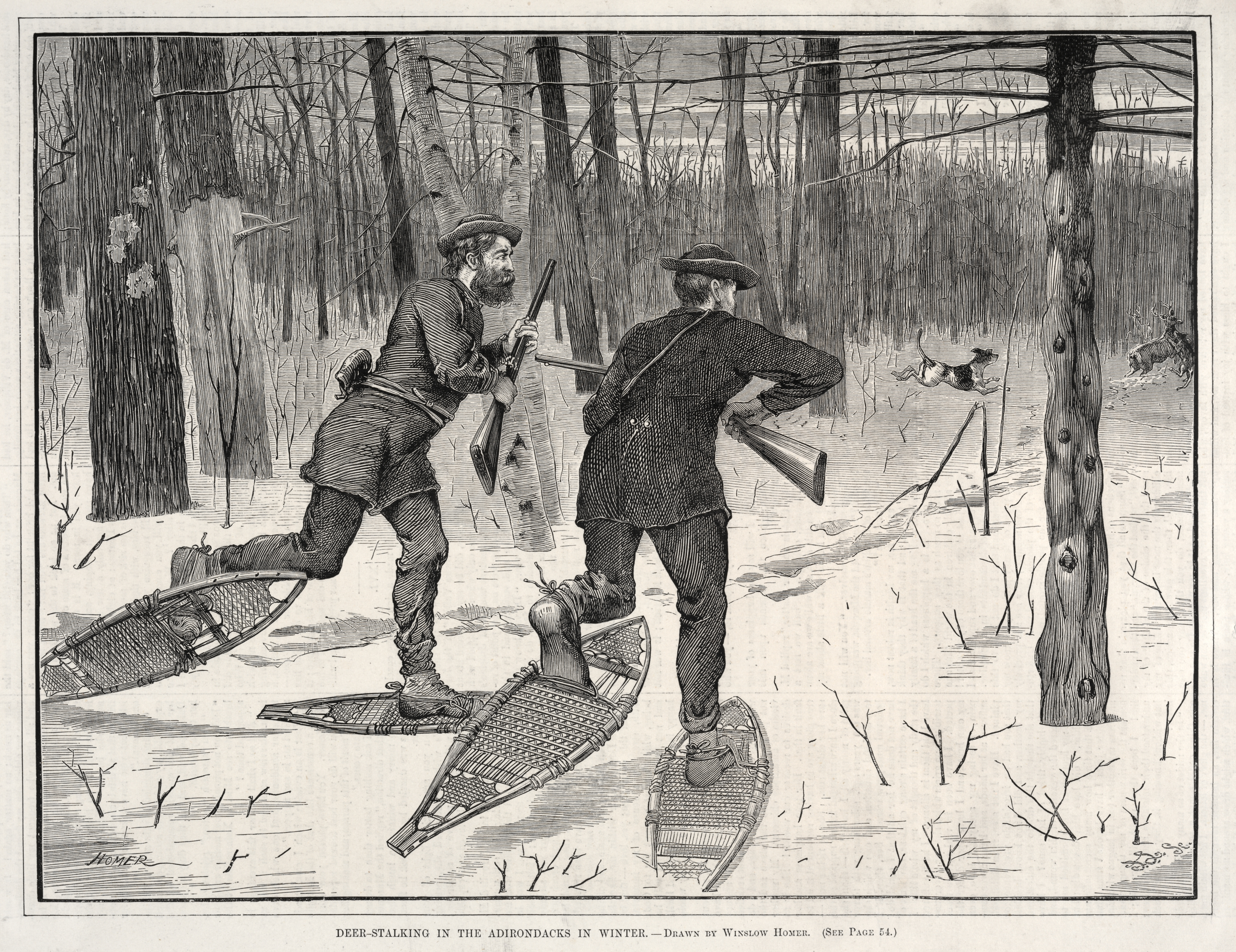
Deer Stalking in the Adirondacks in Winter (1871) by Winslow Homer

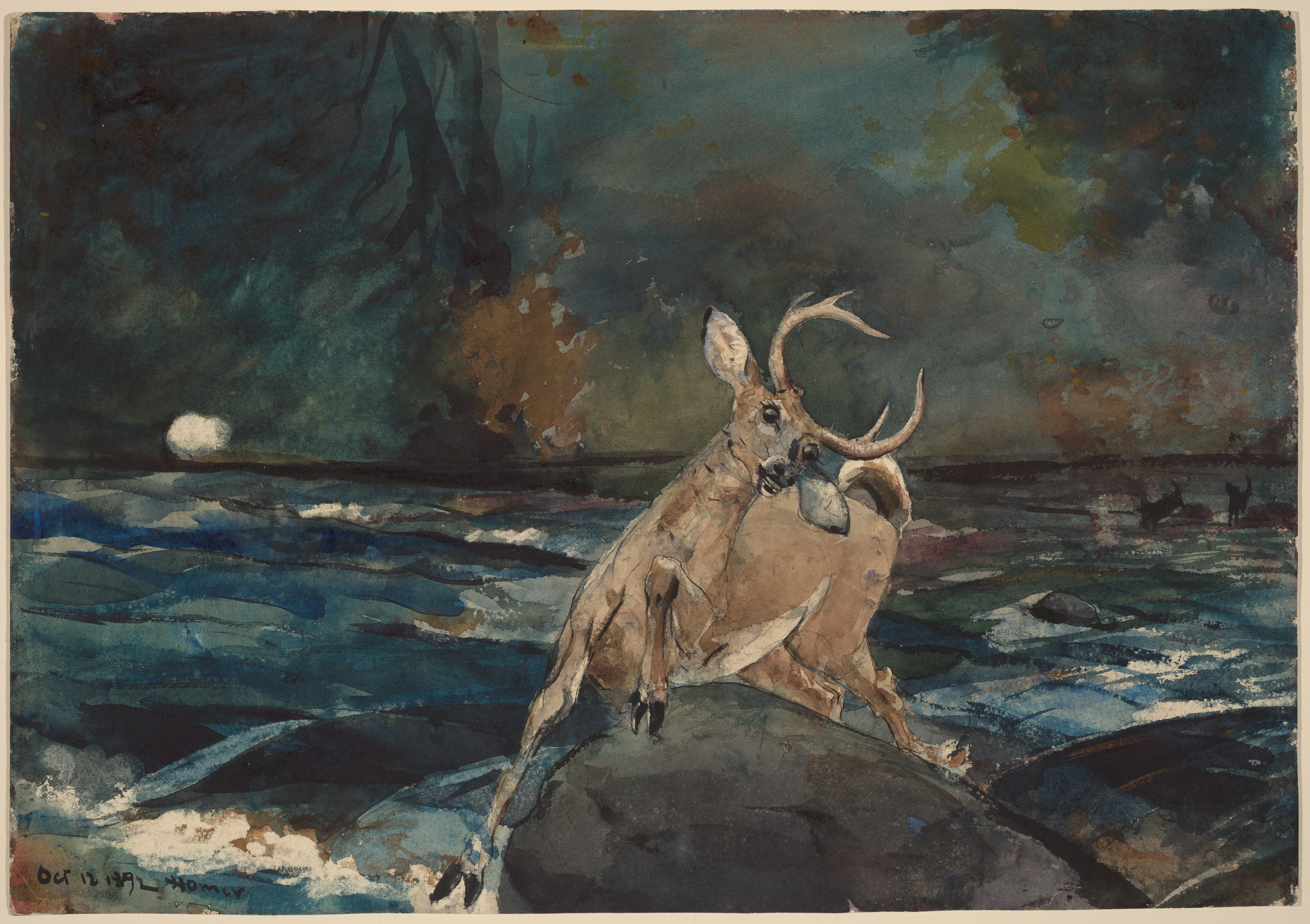
A Good Shot, Adirondacks (1872) by Winslow Homer

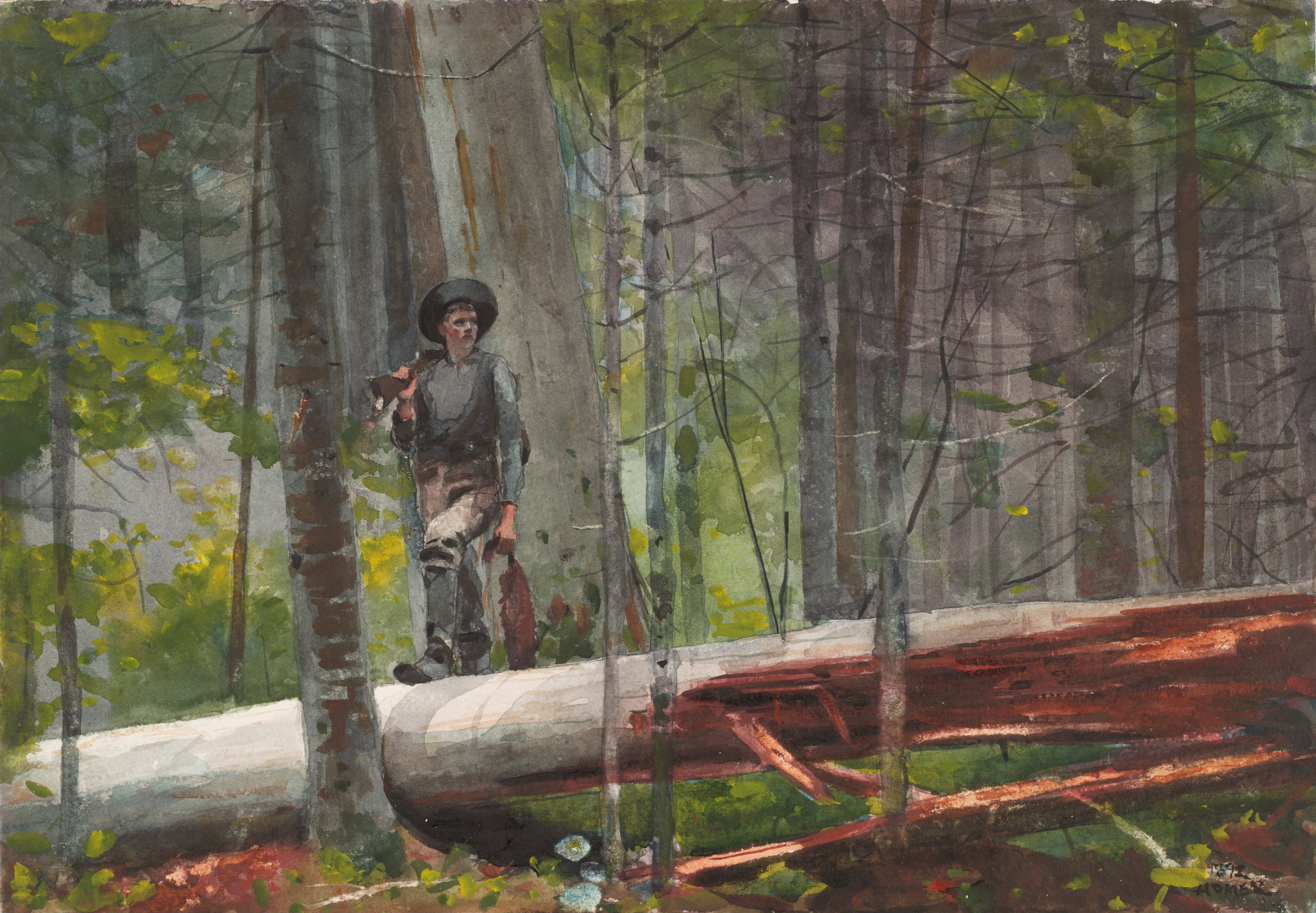
Hunter in the Adirondacks (1892) by Winslow Homer

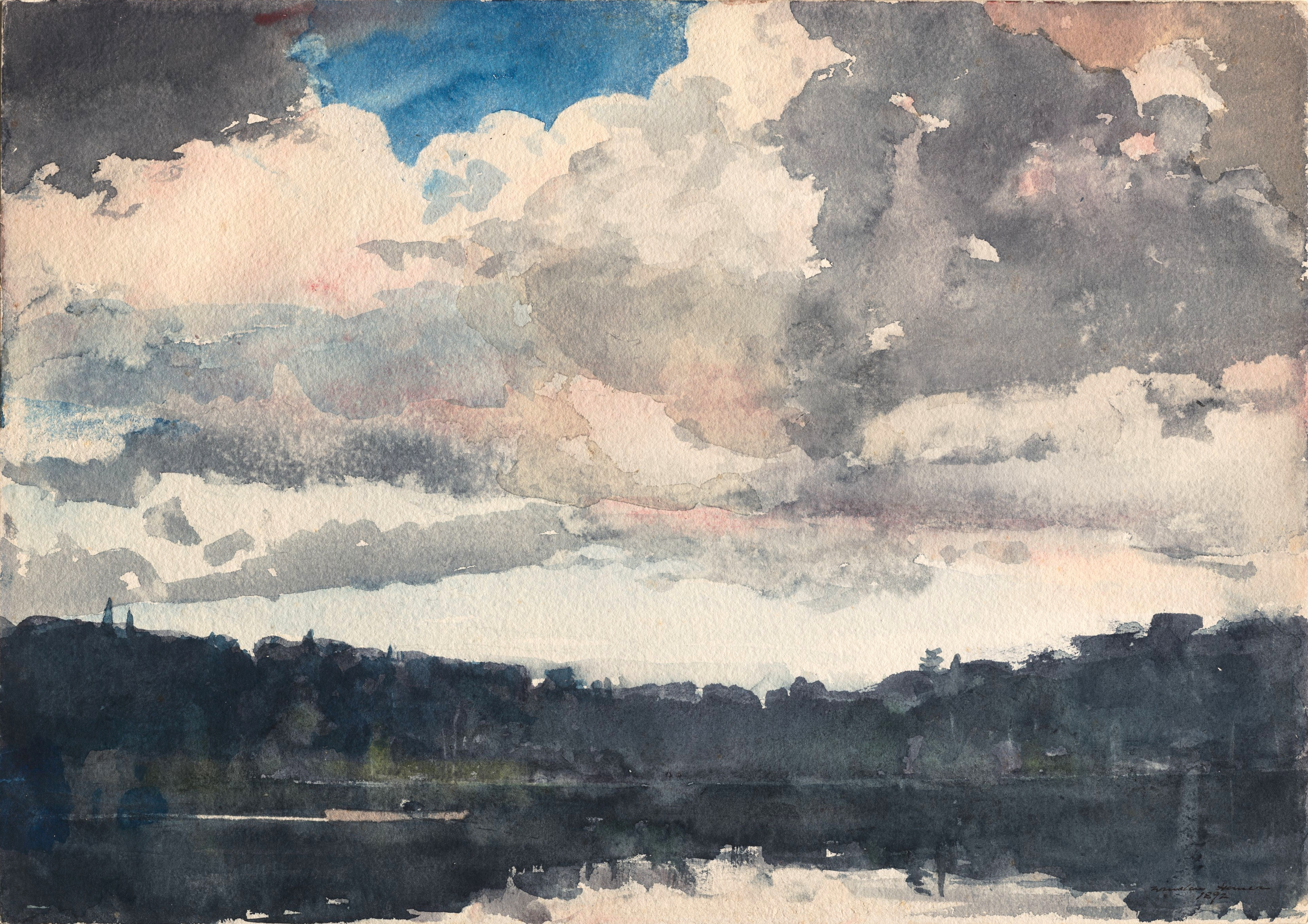
The Lone Boat, North Woods Club, Adirondacks (1892) by Winslow Homer

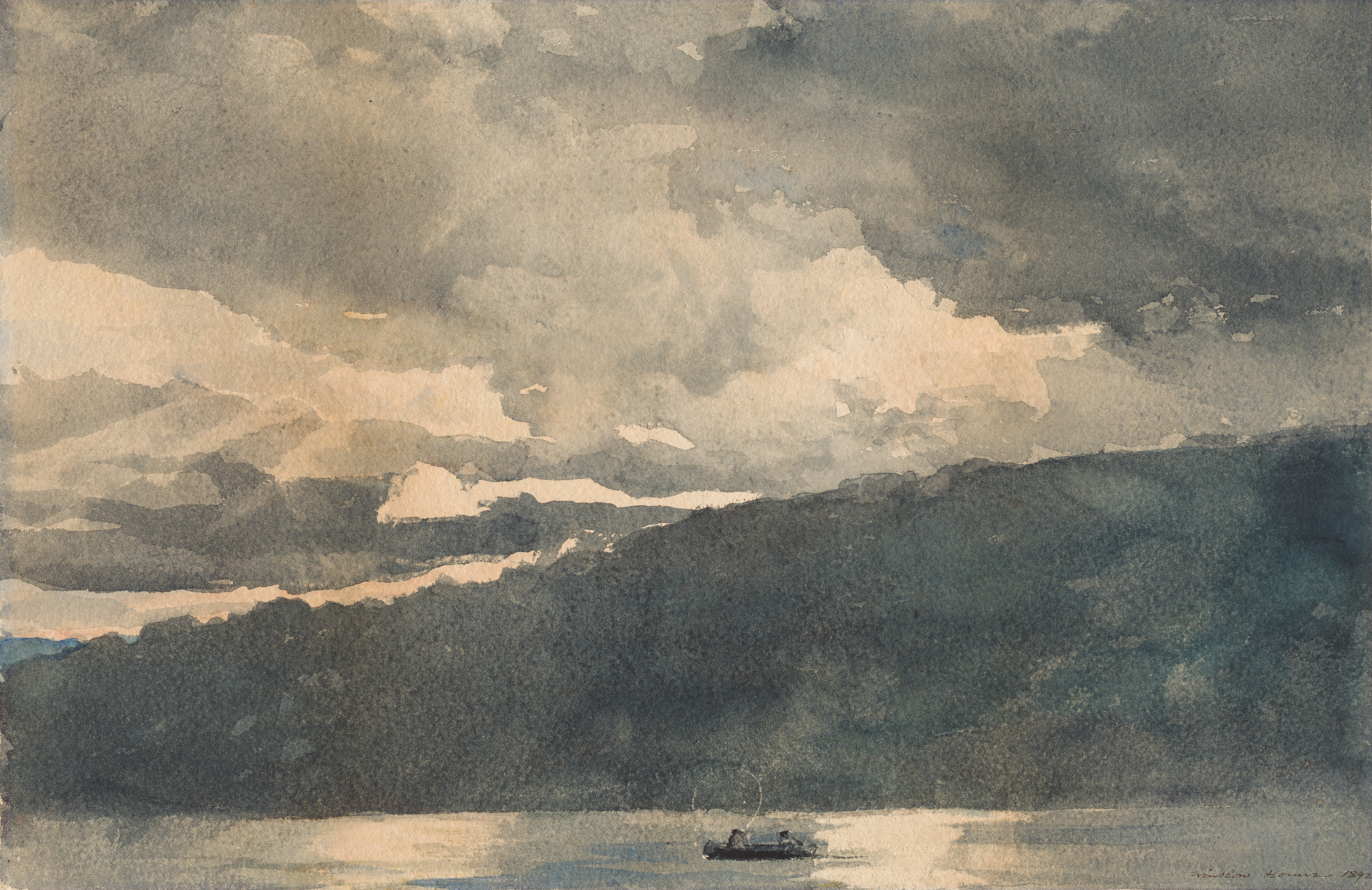
Mink Lake, Adirondacks (1892) by Winslow Homer

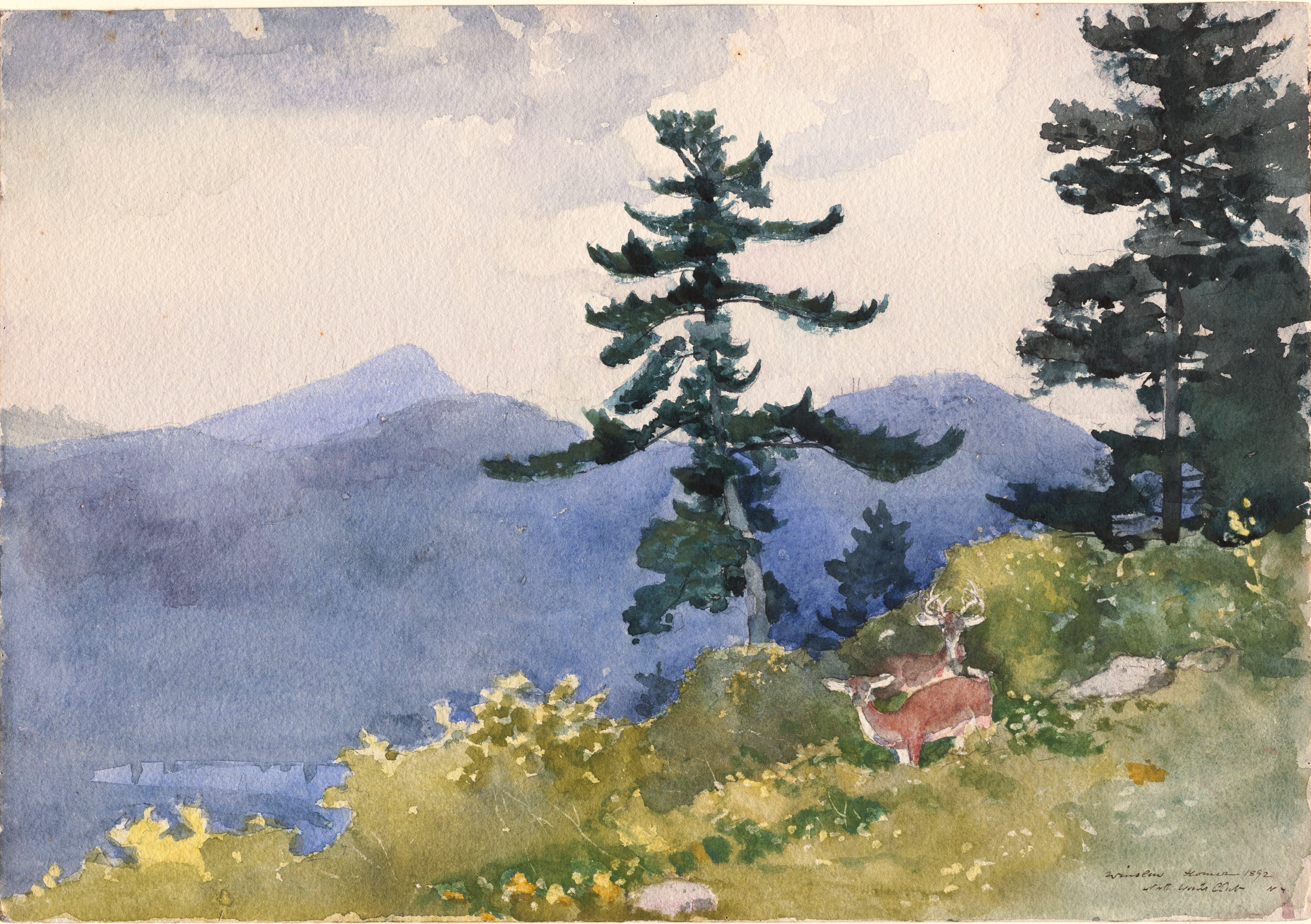
North Woods Club, Adirondacks (The Interrupted Tete-a-Tete) (1892) by Winslow Homer

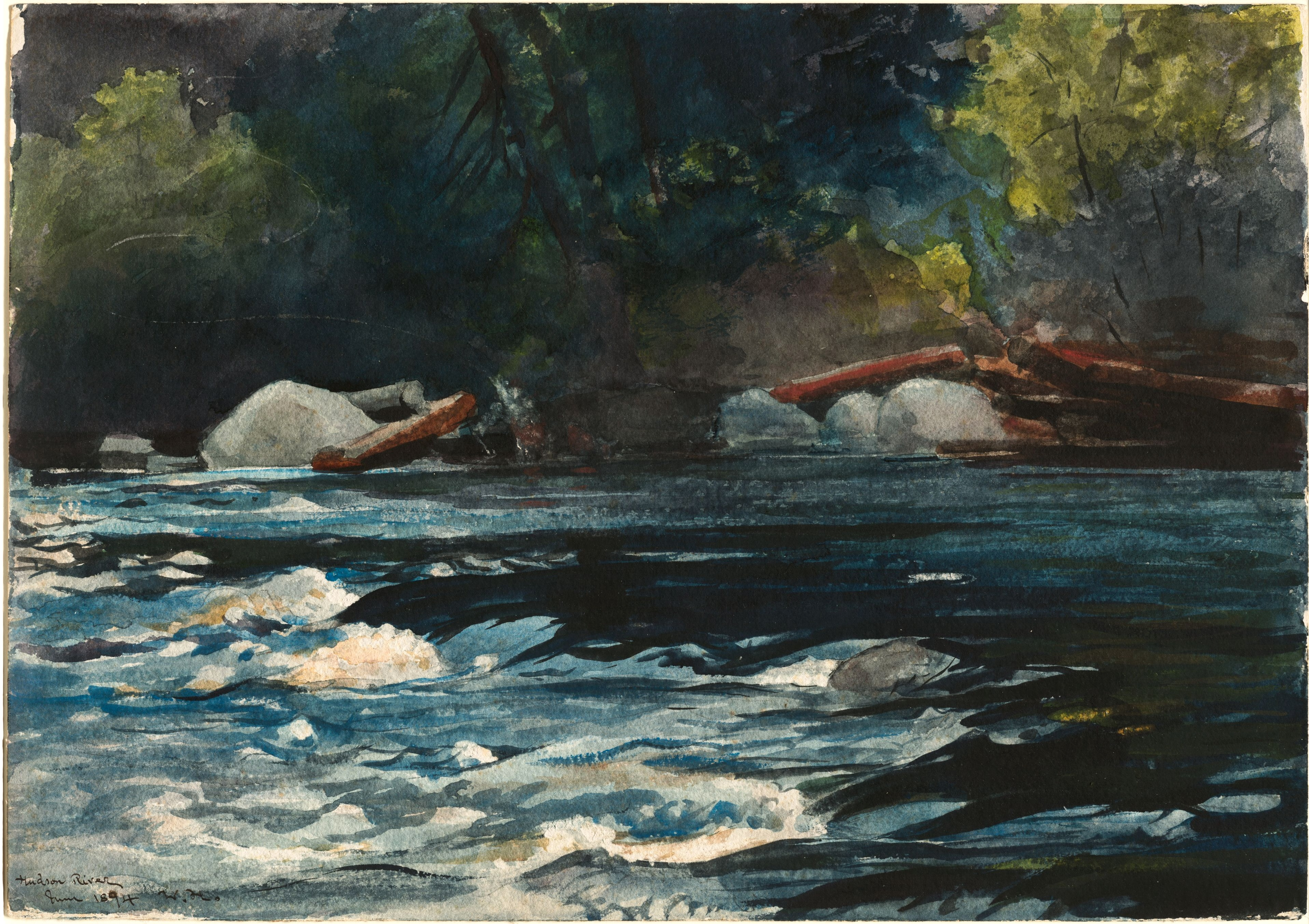
The Rapids, Hudson River, Adirondacks (1894) by Winslow Homer

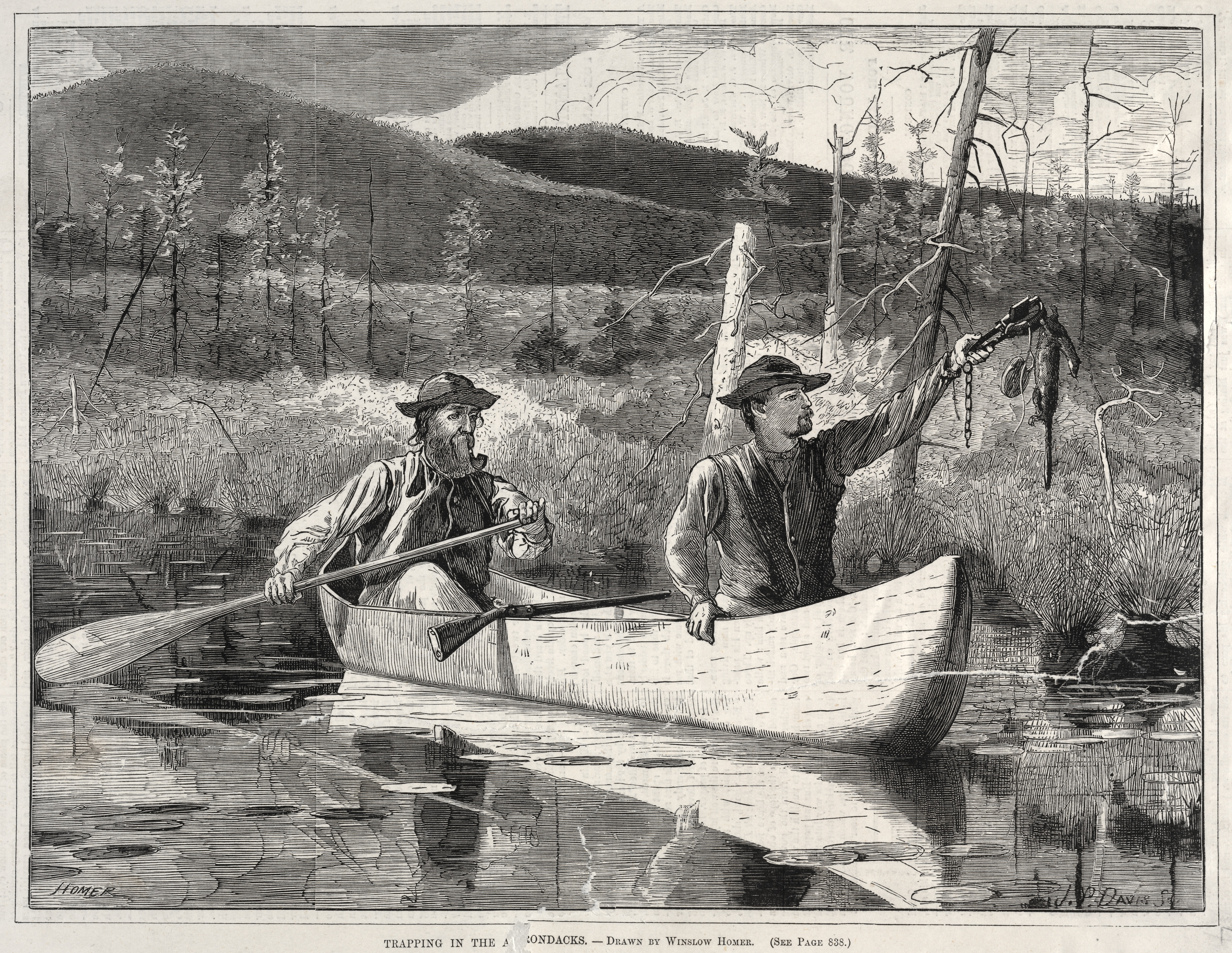
Trapping in the Adirondacks (1870) by Winslow Homer

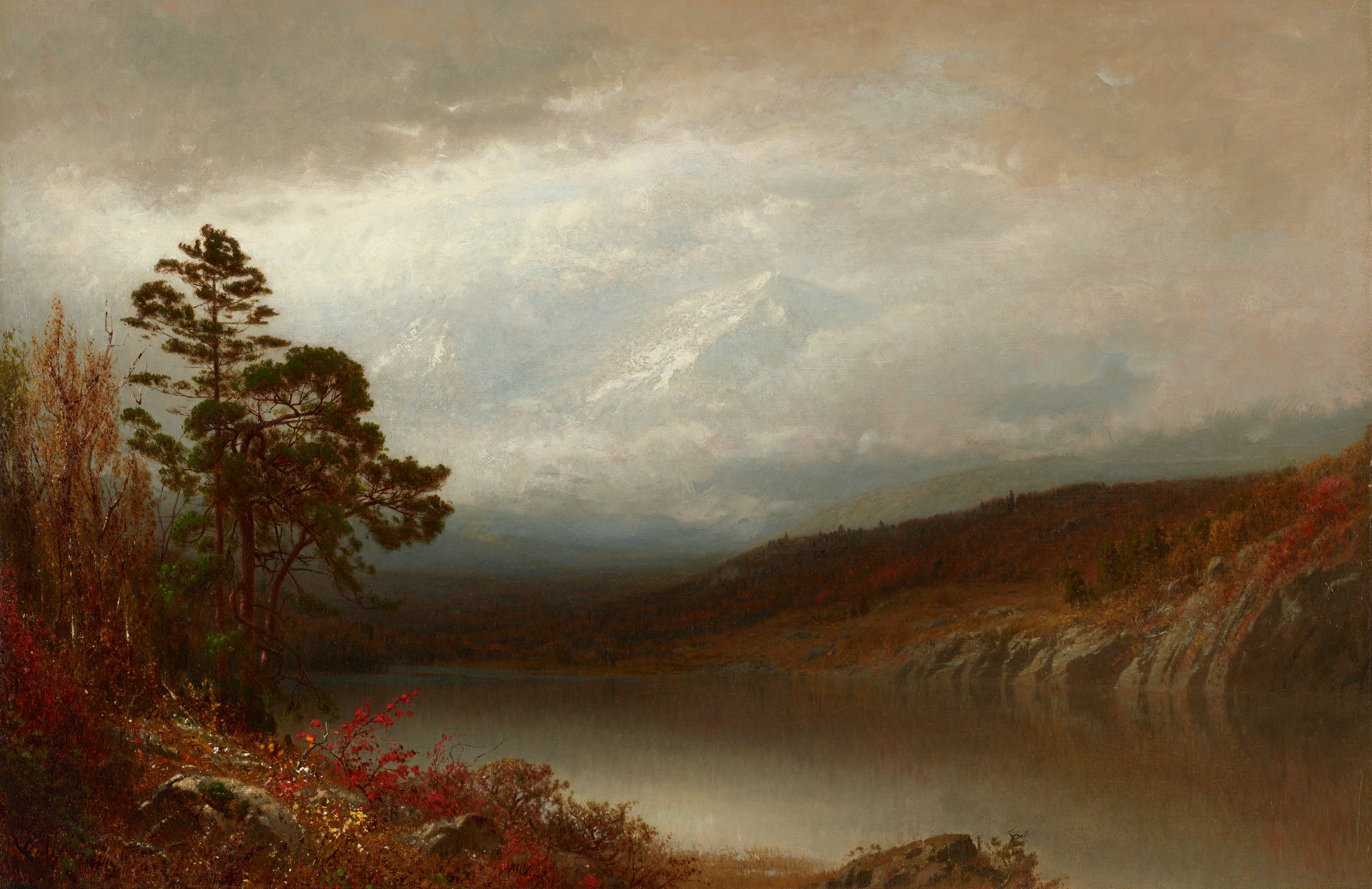
Autumn in the Adirondacks (c. 1872-1873) by Alexander Helwig Wyant

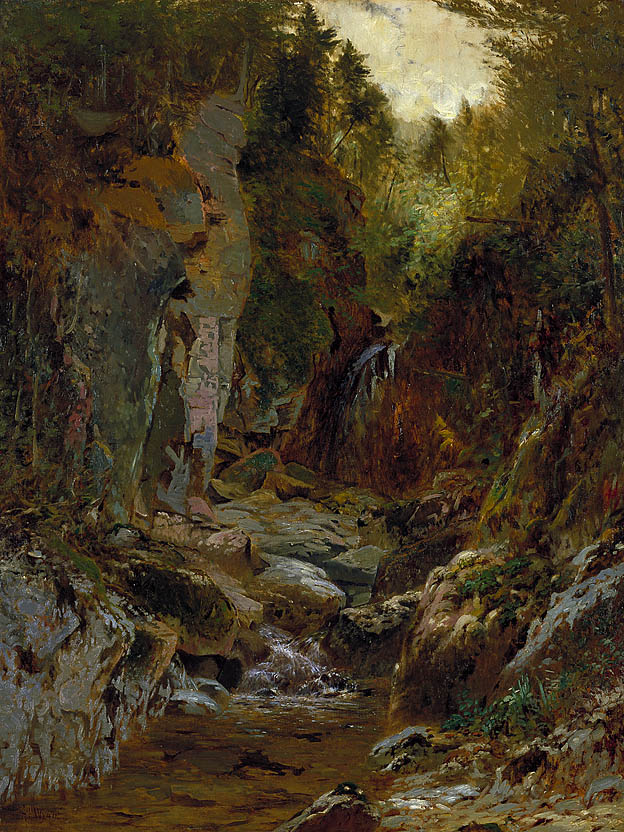
The Flume, Opalescent River, Adirondacks (ca. 1875) by Alexander Helwig Wyant
