= Mirror Lake (New York) =

Lake in the United States

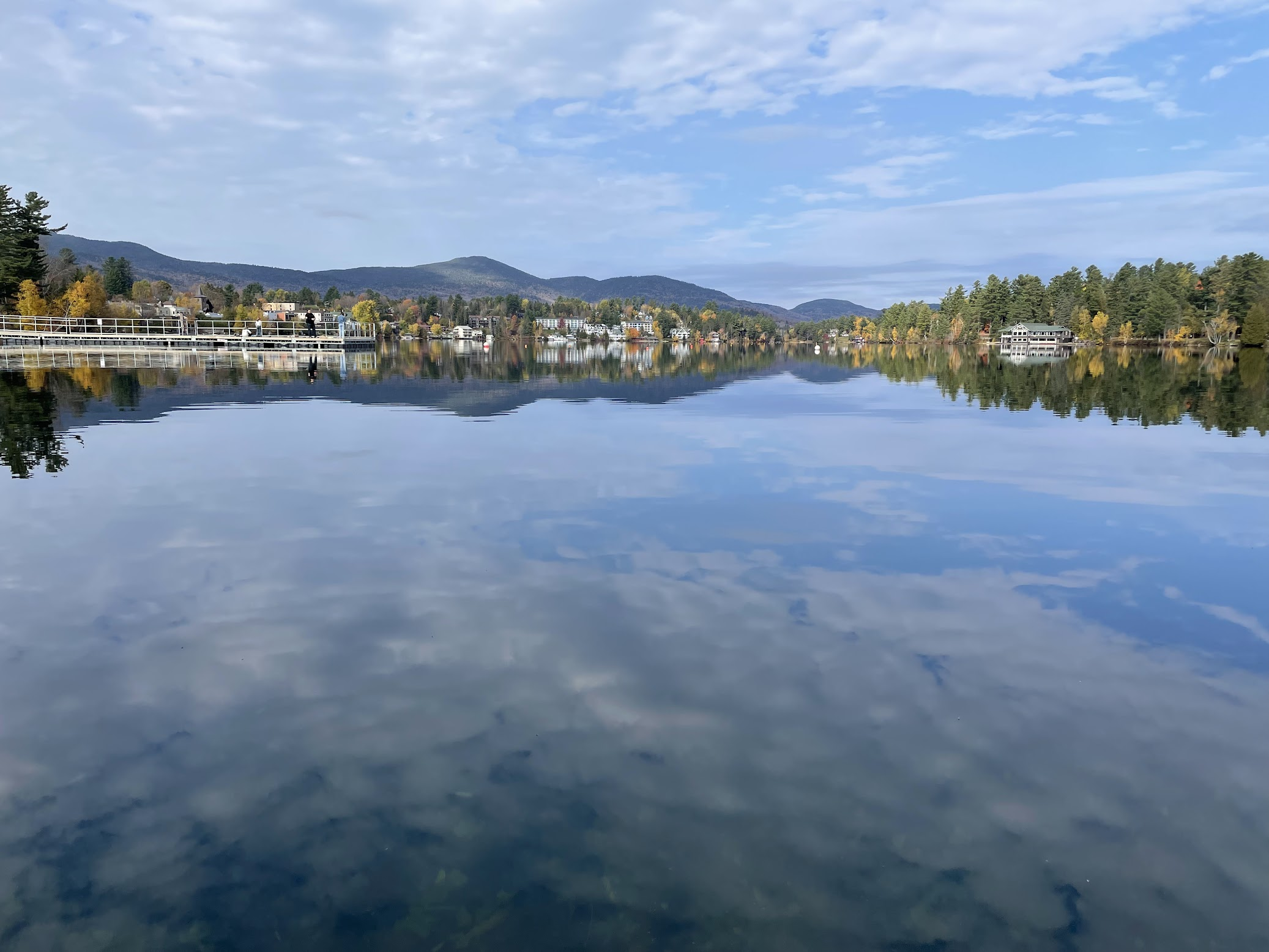
- View from the South end of Mirror Lake, looking towards Lake Placid.

- Location within New York Location within the United States
- Location: Adirondack Mountains, Essex County, New York, US
- Coordinates: 44°17′18″N 73°58′55″W
- Type: lake
- Basin countries: United States
- Surface area: 122 acres (0.49 km^{2})
- Average depth: 14 ft (4.3 m)
- Max. depth: 60 ft (18 m)
- Water volume: 547,808,385 US gal (2.07368032×10^{9} L)
- Surface elevation: 1,854 ft (565 m)
- Settlements: Lake Placid, North Elba

The oligotrophic, circumneutral body of water called Mirror Lake is in the Adirondack Mountains in northern New York in the United States. The lake is approximately 124 acres (0.50 km^{2}), with a watershed area of 741 acres (3.00 km^{2}). 27% of the watershed area is developed, 51% is forested, 2% is wetlands, and 20% is surface water. The lake has a maximum depth of 65 feet (20 m) and an average depth of 14 feet (4.3 m). It is located in the village of Lake Placid, near the center of the town of North Elba in Essex County.

== Recreational Use ==
Situated in the center of the Village of Lake Placid, Mirror Lake sees many forms of recreational use. During the summer it is popular for canoeing, kayaking, swimming, and stand-up paddle boarding. In the winter, you can take a dogsled ride on the lake or ice skate on a maintained track around the perimeter of the lake. The swim portion of the Lake Placid IRONMAN competition takes place in the lake and swim lanes are set up through the summer for swimmers to practice. Motorboats and snowmobiles are not allowed on the lake.

== Lake Monitoring ==
In 2016, the Ausable River Association and Adirondack Watershed Institute launched a comprehensive monitoring program on Mirror Lake. The lake is monitored bi-weekly during the open water season and monthly while the lake is frozen. During each sampling visit surface and bottom water samples are collected for chemical analysis of chlorophyll-a, nutrients, and metals. In addition, vertical profiles of temperature, dissolved oxygen, specific conductance, and pH are recorded at 1 metre (3.3 ft) intervals through the entire water column.

== Threats ==
=== Road Salt ===
Mirror Lake has elevated sodium and chloride concentrations as a result of winter de-icing practices on the roads and sidewalks surrounding the lake. The salt levels are higher than 97% of other lakes surveyed as part of the Adirondack Lake Assessment Program. The surface water chloride concentration (47.8 mg/L) is 239-time higher than the average for Adirondack lakes not impacted by road salt. In addition, Mirror Lake experiences a buildup of salt laden water at the bottom of the lake as a result of direct stormwater inputs. At the bottom of the lake chloride concentrations have been recorded as high as 125 mg/L, or 520-times higher than lakes not impacted by road salt.

=== Low Dissolved Oxygen ===
Deep water dissolved oxygen is important to maintaining a healthy cold-water fishery, especially for native lake trout. Mirror Lake experiences low dissolved oxygen at the bottom of the lake during the summer months. While this phenomenon is natural in some lakes, ongoing research on Mirror Lake is seeking to determine whether land use and stormwater runoff are exacerbating the low dissolved oxygen situation in Mirror Lake.
