= George O'Connor (comics) =

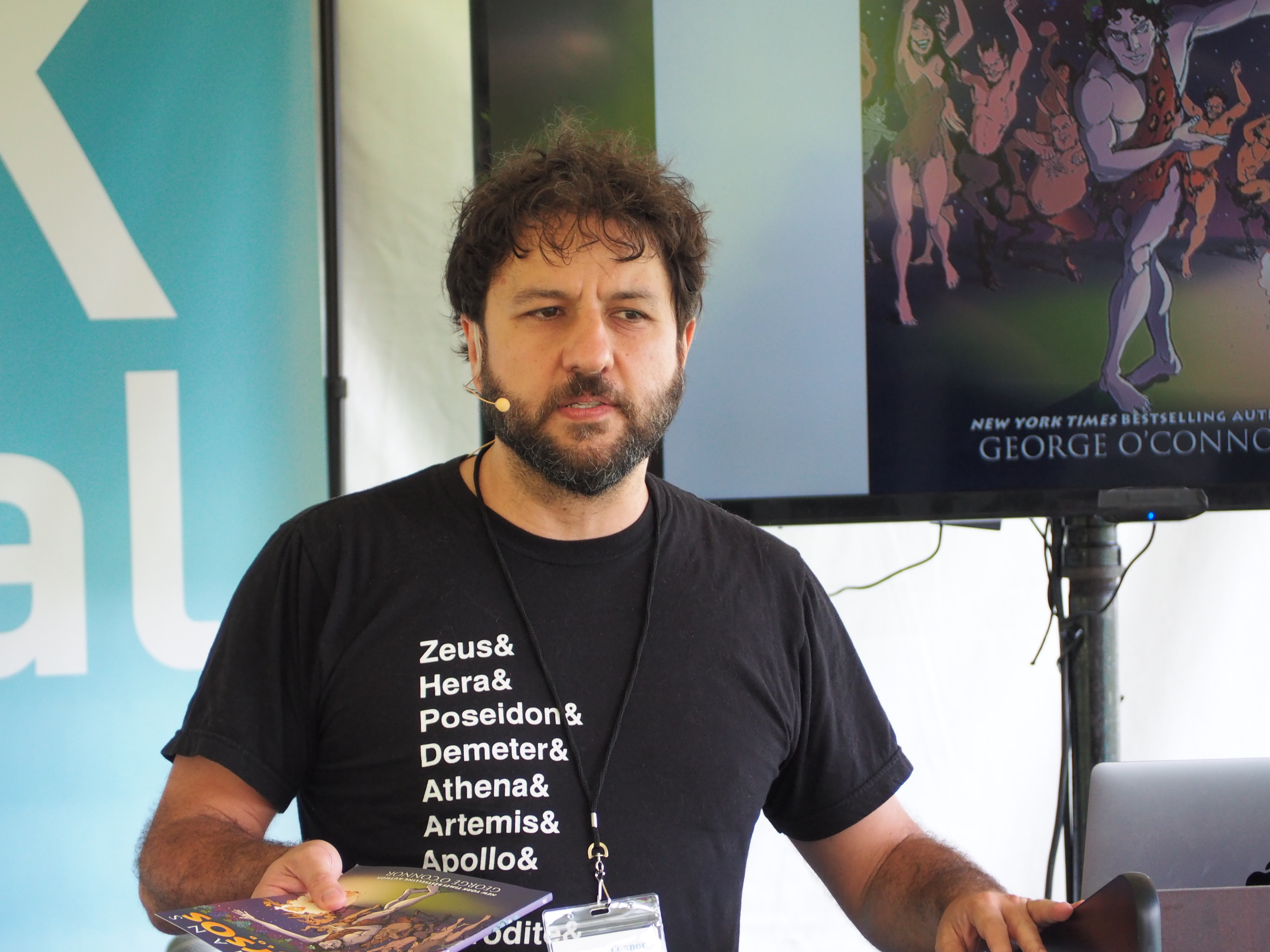
- Born: November 5, 1973 (age 53) New York
- Areas: Cartoonist, Writer, Penciller
- Notable works: Journey into Mohawk Country, Ball Peen Hammer, Olympians series

George O'Connor (born November 5, 1973) is an American author, cartoonist and illustrator living in Brooklyn.

== Career ==
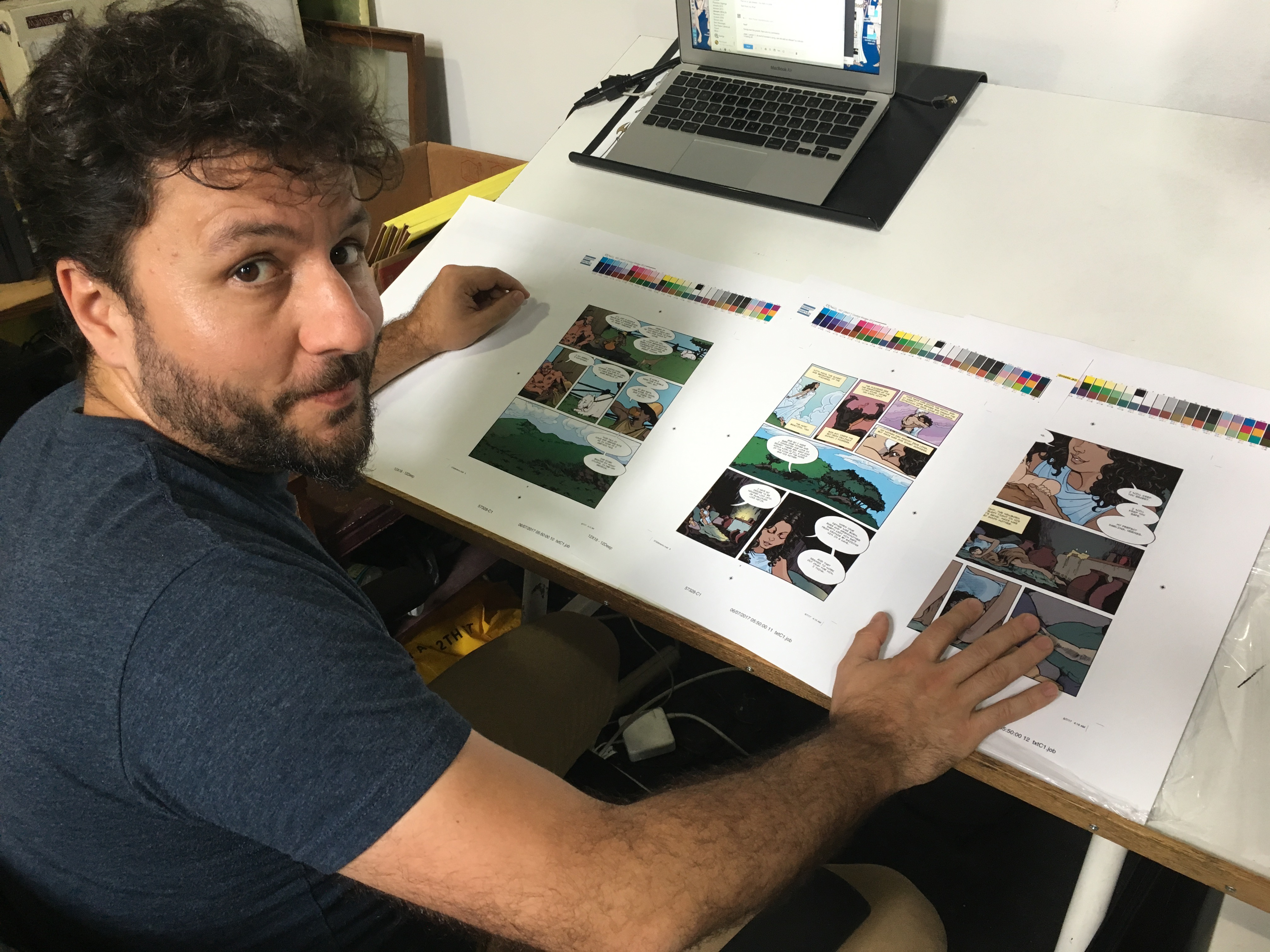
In the studio, 2017

O'Connor's first picture book, Kapow!, was a New York Times bestseller.

His first graphic novel, Journey into Mohawk Country, was published in 2006. It uses as its sole text an English translation of the journal kept by the Dutch barber, surgeon, and explorer Harmen Meyndertsz van den Bogaert, who in 1634 journeyed from what is now Albany, New York 100 miles into the interior of the North American continent. This journal is one of the earliest extant accounts of the Iroquois people.

O'Connor followed up Journey with his work on Ball Peen Hammer, the first graphic novel written by famed playwright Adam Rapp. Set in the near future of an unnamed city after a societal collapse, the story follows the lives and loves of a handful of survivors.

He also storyboarded and contributed illustrations for the "graphic novel" portions of the ABC news special Earth 2100.

From 2010 to 2022, O'Connor wrote and illustrated Olympians, a 12-volume graphic novel retelling of the Greek myths, with one volume for each of the twelve Olympians. He is currently working on a four-book series on the Norse gods entitled Asgardians, with the first being on Odin.

== Bibliography ==
=== Picture books ===
- Sally and the Some-Thing (2006)
- Kapow! (2007)
- Uncle Bigfoot (2008)
- Ker-Splash! (2010)
- If I Had a Raptor (2014)
- If I Had a Triceratops (2015)
- Captain Awesome series (illustrator)

=== Graphic novels ===
- Journey into Mohawk Country, written by Harmen Meyndertsz van den Bogaert (September 5, 2006)
- Ball Peen Hammer, written by Adam Rapp (September 29, 2009)
- Olympians series
  - Volume 1: Zeus: King of the Gods (January 5, 2010)
  - Volume 2: Athena: Grey-Eyed Goddess (April 13, 2010)
  - Volume 3: Hera: The Goddess and her Glory (July 19, 2011)
  - Volume 4: Hades: Lord of the Dead (January 31, 2012)
  - Volume 5: Poseidon: Earth Shaker (March 19, 2013)
  - Volume 6: Aphrodite: Goddess of Love (December 31, 2013)
  - Boxed Set: Includes the first six volumes in the series (October 7, 2014)
  - Volume 7: Ares: Bringer of War (January 27, 2015)
  - Volume 8: Apollo: The Brilliant One (January 26, 2016)
  - Volume 9: Artemis: Wild Goddess of the Hunt (January 31, 2017)
  - Volume 10: Hermes: Tales of the Trickster (January 30, 2018)
  - Volume 11: Hephaistos: God of Fire (January 29, 2019)
  - Volume 12: Dionysos: The New God (March 8, 2022)
  - Boxed Set: Includes volumes seven through twelve in the series (March 8, 2022)
- Unrig: How to Fix Our Broken Democracy (World Citizen Comics), written by Daniel G. Newman (July 7, 2020)
- Asgardians series
  - Volume 1: Odin (March 26, 2024)
  - Volume 2: Thor (October 8, 2024)
  - Volume 3: Loki (October 14, 2025)
  - Volume 4: Ragnarök (March 30, 2027)
