= Harmen van den Bogaert =

Dutch settler and barber surgeon

Harmen Meyndertsz van den Bogaert
- Born: 1612 or 1613; Dutch Republic
- Died: 1648; Hudson River near Fort Orange (New Netherland), New Netherland
- Occupations: Barber surgeon and explorer

Harmen Meyndertsz van den Bogaert (1612/13–1648) was an early Dutch settler in New Netherland (present-day New York), explorer, and barber surgeon. Van den Bogaert's personal journal from his expedition into Iroquois country, A Journey into Mohawk and Oneida Country, 1634-1635, is the first written description of the Mohawk Valley and among the first ethnographic accounts of the Iroquois people and the Mohawk language. He is also notable for being among the first known people in the Americas to die as a result of their homosexuality.

== Early life ==
Van den Bogaert completed his apprenticeship as a barber surgeon at the age of 18.

On March 21, 1630, Van den Bogaert boarded the ship Unity-Concord (originally named Eendracht in Dutch) and set sail from Texel to New Amsterdam. Also aboard was Wolfert Gerritsen van Couwenhoven, one of the Dutch West India Company's original five head-farmers sent to New Netherland in 1625. Van den Bogaert arrived on May 24, 1630 after 2 months at sea.

== A Journey into Mohawk and Oneida Country 1634-1635 ==
Van den Bogaert was employed as a commissary, a business agent, of the Dutch West India Company at Fort Orange, the site where the present-day city of Albany would later develop. After a stall in the company's lucrative fur trade with the Indigenous Iroquois People, Van den Bogaert and two others were ordered to embark on an expedition to enquire for an explanation for the lack of business and to restore the fur trade.

Van den Bogaert penned a daily journal of his expedition from 1634 to 1635. He recorded not only the daily activities of his party, but also wrote of the geography of the land and of Iroquois life, settlements, healing rituals, and language. The journal is the earliest known record of the interior west of the Hudson. As one of the earliest European accounts of the Iroquois Five Nations, it is also of great historical and ethnological value.

A wordlist, found at the end of Van den Bogaert's journal, is the earliest known philological treatment of the Mohawk language in existence.

The existence of Van den Bogaert's journal only came to light in 1895, and contemporary interest in the text only surged after an English translation by Charles T. Gehring (with annotations by William A. Starna) in 1991. Gehring's translation of the journal inspired George O'Connor’s first graphic novel, Journey into Mohawk Country, which uses the events of the journal as its sole material.

== Van den Bogaert's homosexuality and death ==
Van den Bogaert was engaged in a homosexual relationship African slave, Tobias.

Toward the end of 1647, Van den Bogaert was caught “en flagrante” with Tobias and they both were jailed at Fort Orange. Cognizant that the punishment for homosexual relations throughout the Dutch Empire was death, they escaped together and fled north for the Iroquois lands with which van den Bogaert was well acquainted from his expedition.

He and Tobias were subsequently found and captured by Dutch soldiers and returned to Fort Orange. Van den Bogaert, in a final act of desperation, escaped again from the fort's prison. During this escape, Van den Bogaert attempted to cross the frozen over Hudson River, but fell through the ice and drowned. He had not yet reached his 40s at the time of his death. The fate of Tobias is unknown.
