= Mount Colden =

Mountain in New York, United States

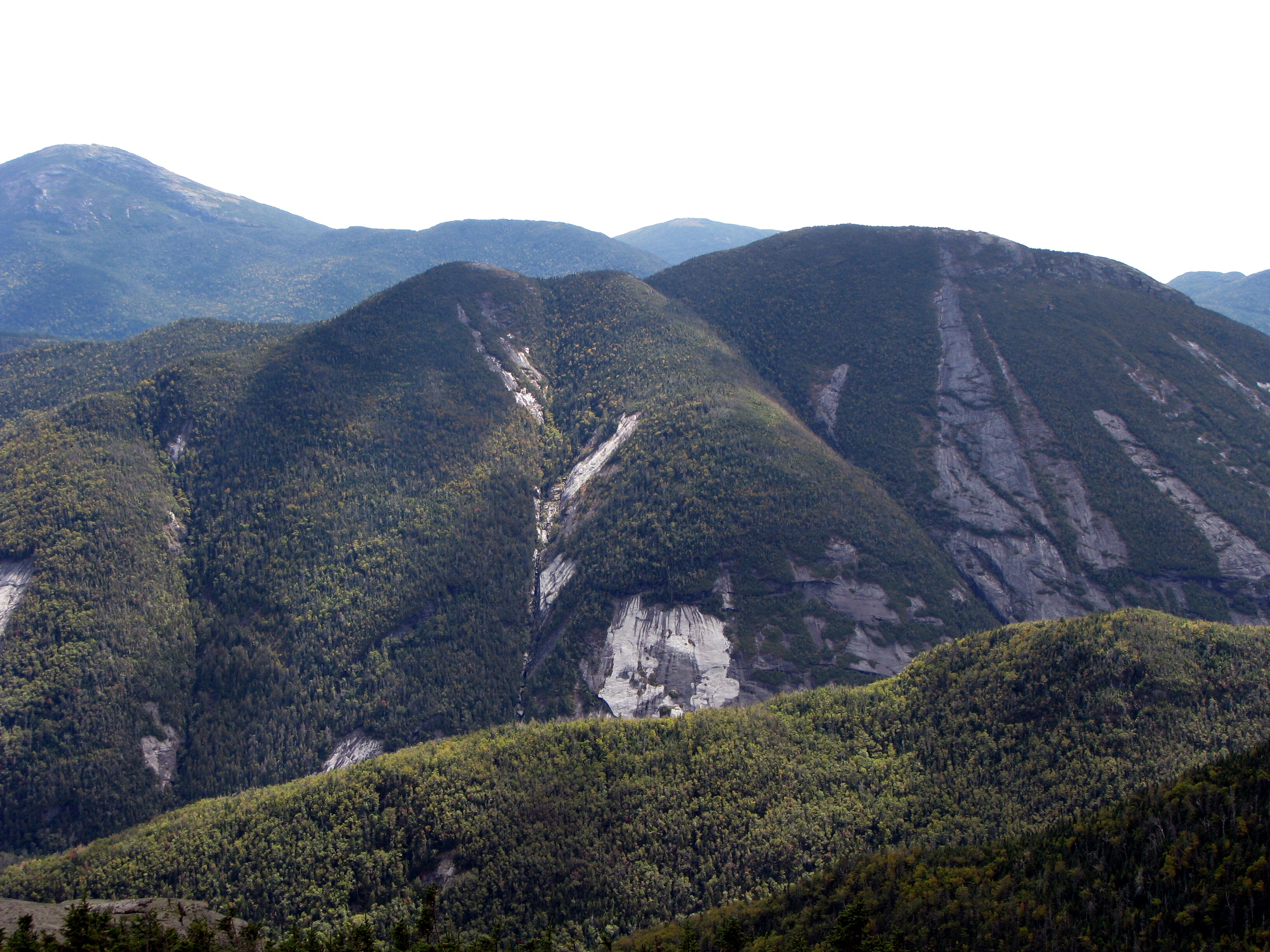
- Mount Colden as seen from Wright Peak

Highest point
- Elevation: 4,714 ft (1,437 m) NGVD 29
- Listing: Adirondack High Peaks 11th
- Coordinates: 44°07′37″N 73°57′36″W

Geography
- Location within New York
- Location: Keene, New York, U.S.
- Parent range: Adirondacks
- Topo map: USGS North Elba

Climbing
- First ascent: July 1849, by Robert Clark and Alexander Ralph
- Easiest route: Hike from the Adirondak Loj

Mount Colden is a mountain in the Adirondacks in the U.S. state of New York. It is the eleventh-highest peak in New York, with an elevation of 4,714 feet (1,437 m), and one of the 46 High Peaks in Adirondack Park. It is located in the town of Keene in Essex County. The peak is named after David C. Colden, an investor in the McIntyre Iron Works at Tahawus. The mountain is known for the Trap Dike, a large crevice that runs from a point near the summit on its west face to nearby Avalanche Lake. The summit of Mount Colden can be reached by two hiking trails, which are frequently combined to form a circuit through Avalanche Pass, or by climbing the Trap Dike. The summit is in an alpine tundra zone above the treeline, and offers views of surrounding mountains and lakes.

== Geology ==
Mount Colden is primarily composed of anorthosite granite. The western face of the mountain forms a sheer fault-line escarpment over Avalanche Lake, matching Avalanche Mountain to the northwest. A dike located on the west face, known as the Trap Dike, Avalanche Dike, and Colden Dike, is composed of metamorphic rock formed through hydrothermal metamorphism, which contains large concentrations of garnet. The dike has been partially eroded, leaving a prominent gorge up to 80 feet (24 m) wide 100 feet (30 m) deep that extends from near the summit down to Avalanche Lake. Landslides in the mountain's past have scarred the western slopes with large slides and were responsible for separating Avalanche Lake from nearby Lake Colden. Recent landslides were observed in 1869, 1942, 1990, 1999, 2011, and 2025.

== History ==
The Mohawk name Ou-no-war-lah, meaning "scalp mountain", was recorded as used for the mountain by Alfred B. Street in the 19th century.

The peak was named after David C. Colden, an investor in the McIntyre Iron Works at Tahawus, by William Charles Redfield in 1836. The proprietors of the Iron Works were displeased with Redfield for his decision to name a peak without their permission, and the peak was briefly renamed Mount McMartin the next year by Redfield and Ebenezer Emmons. However, the older name persisted. The first recorded ascent of the mountain was made by Robert Clark and Alexander Ralph, two employees of the Iron Works, who climbed up the dike in July 1849.

== Ascent routes ==
There are two maintained trails up Mount Colden. The first, which approaches from the northeast, passes by Lake Arnold before ascending the summit after crossing over a false summit. The second trail, which is steeper and features ladders and stairs, approaches from the southwest, starting from Lake Colden. Both approaches can be combined by returning or approaching through Avalanche Pass. Starting from the Adirondak Loj to the north, hiking over Mount Colden and through Avalanche Pass is a 13.8 miles (22.2 km) loop. Lake Colden and the southwest approach can also be reached from the Upper Works trailhead on the Calamity Brook Trail. Finally, the summit of Mount Colden can be reached by climbing the Trap Dike from Avalanche Lake, which leads to a long slide and a short bushwhack to the summit. This last approach does not follow a maintained trail and is rated a Class 4 climb on the Yosemite Decimal System. Deaths and injuries have occurred on the dike, and between 2011 and 2021, an increasing number of rescues were made due to climbing attempts by inexperienced climbers.

The summit of Mount Colden is in an alpine tundra zone above the treeline. From the bare summit, views are available of Avalanche Lake, Lake Colden, and the Flowed Lands below, as well as the neighboring summits of Mount Marcy and Algonquin Peak.

== Gallery ==
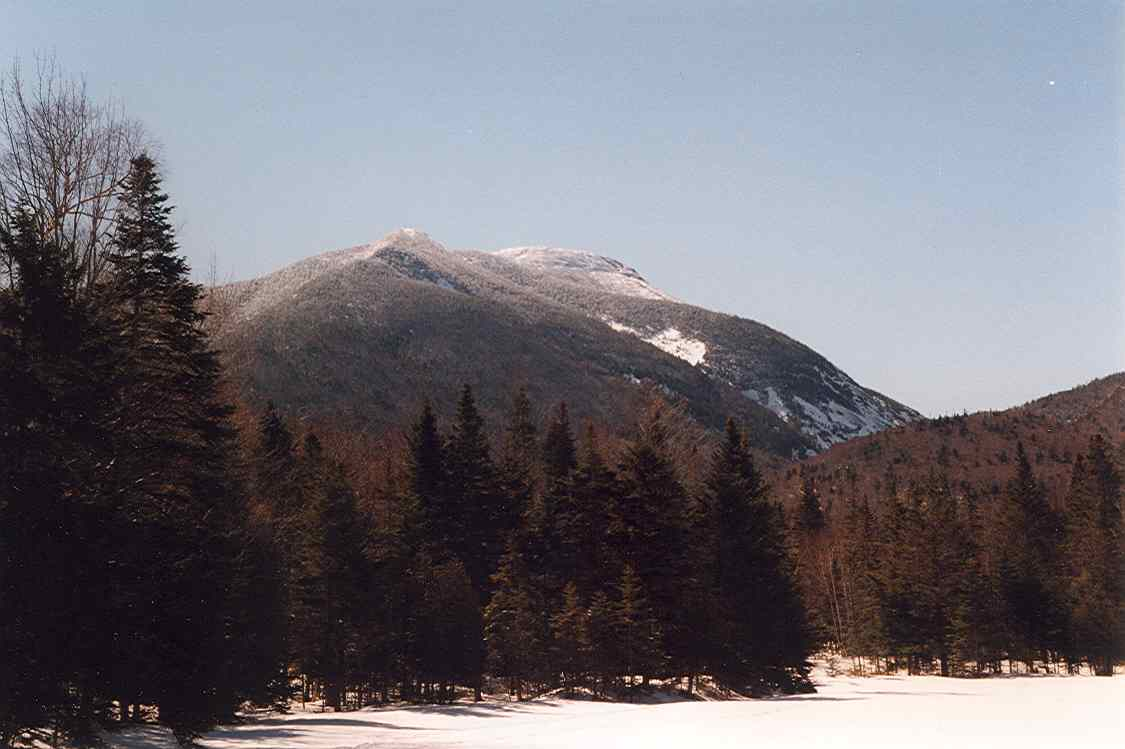
Mount Colden seen from Marcy Dam

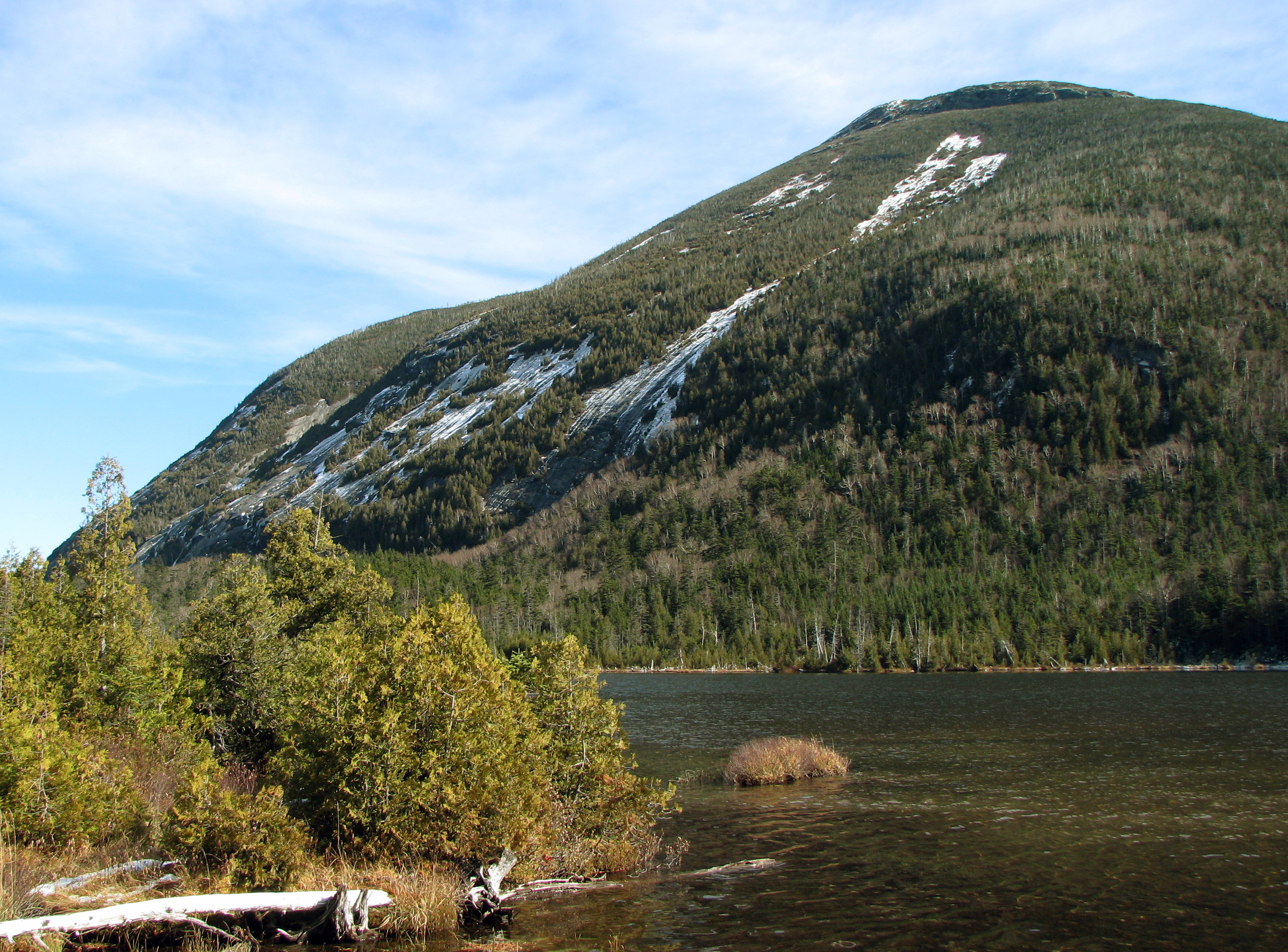
Mount Colden from Lake Colden near the Interior Outpost

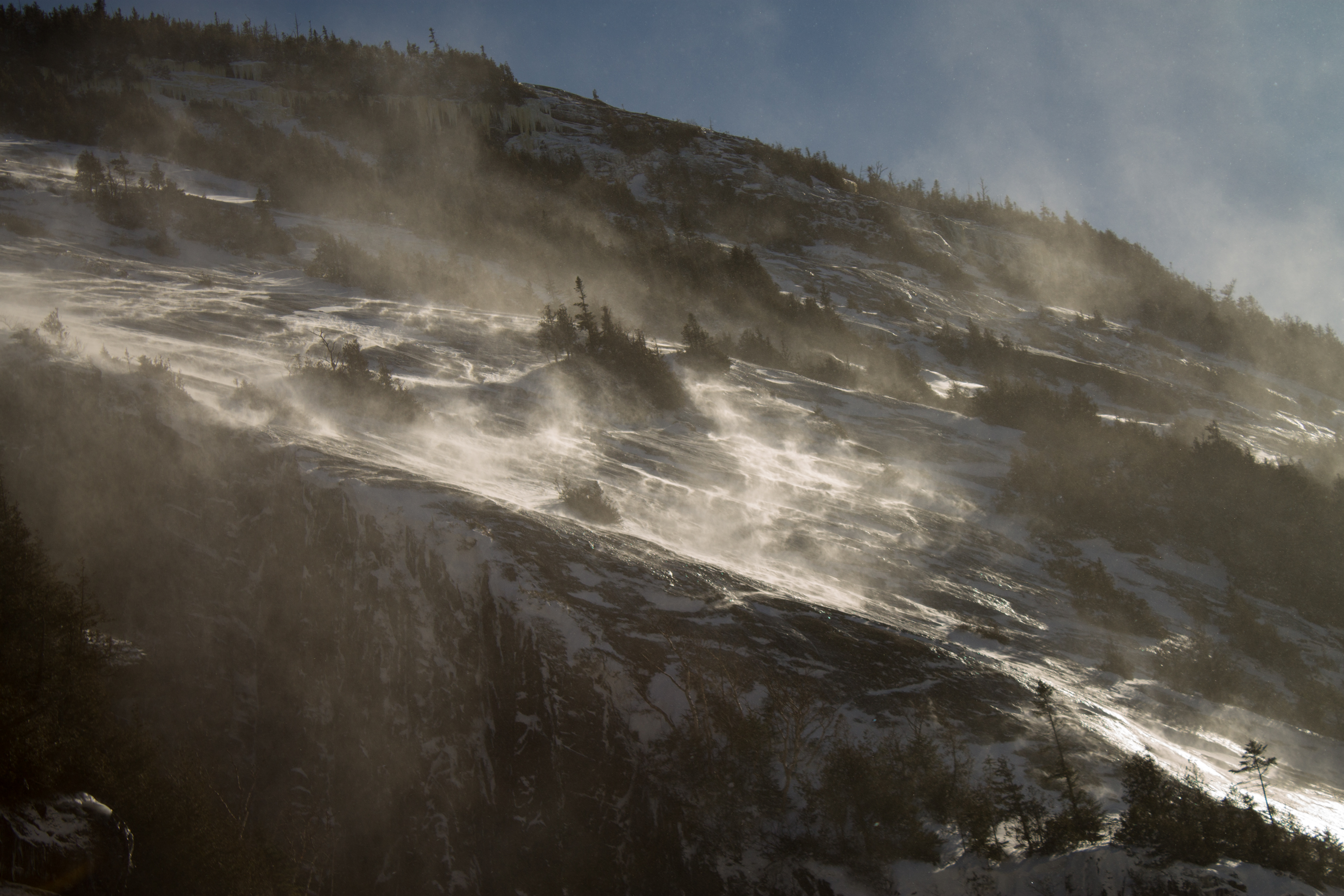
The Trap Dike from Avalanche Lake

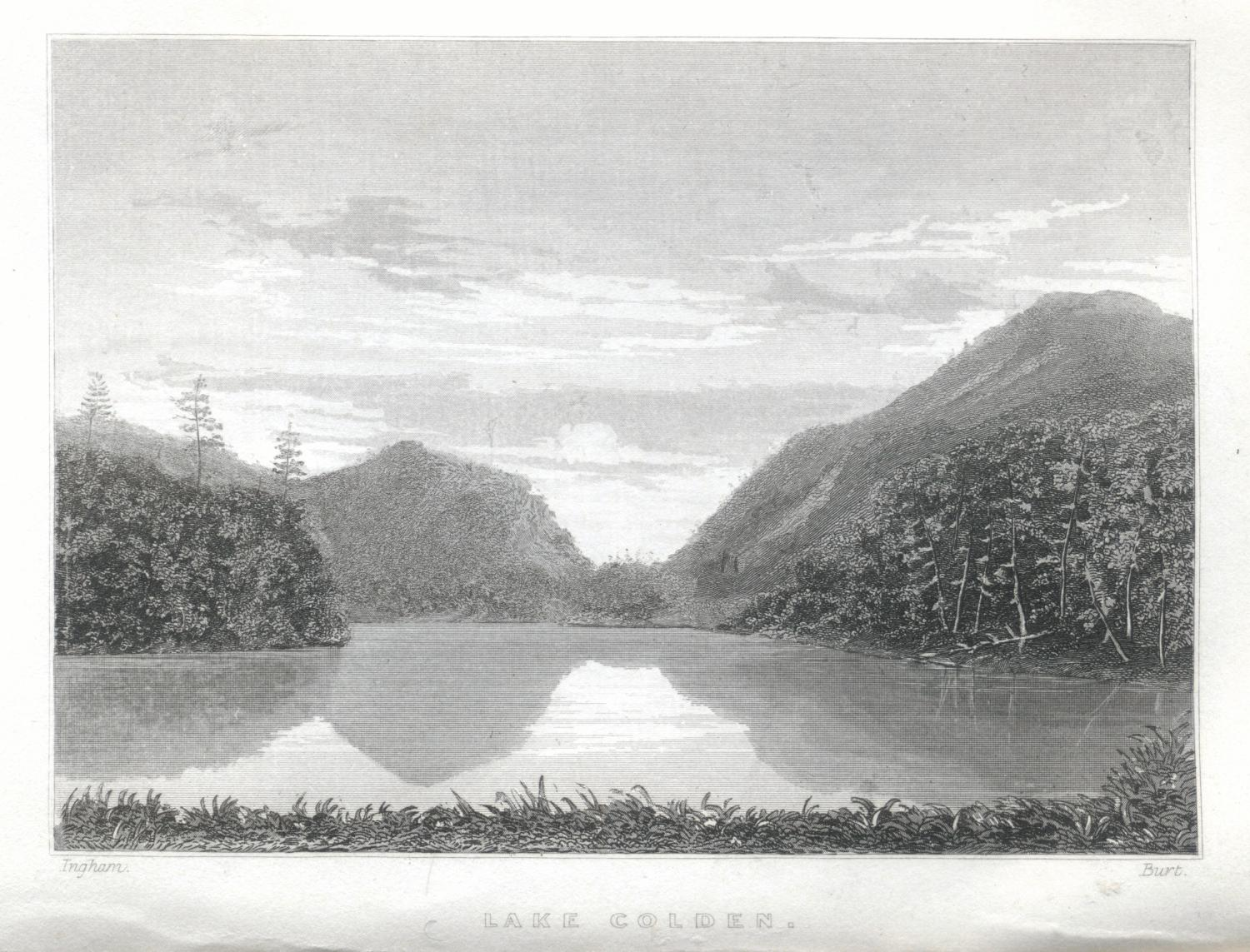
Mt. Colden, Caribou Mt., and Lake Colden as seen from the southwest. From Joel Tyler Headley's The Adirondack; or Life in the Woods (1849)
