= Lake Colden =

Lake in Essex County, New York, United States

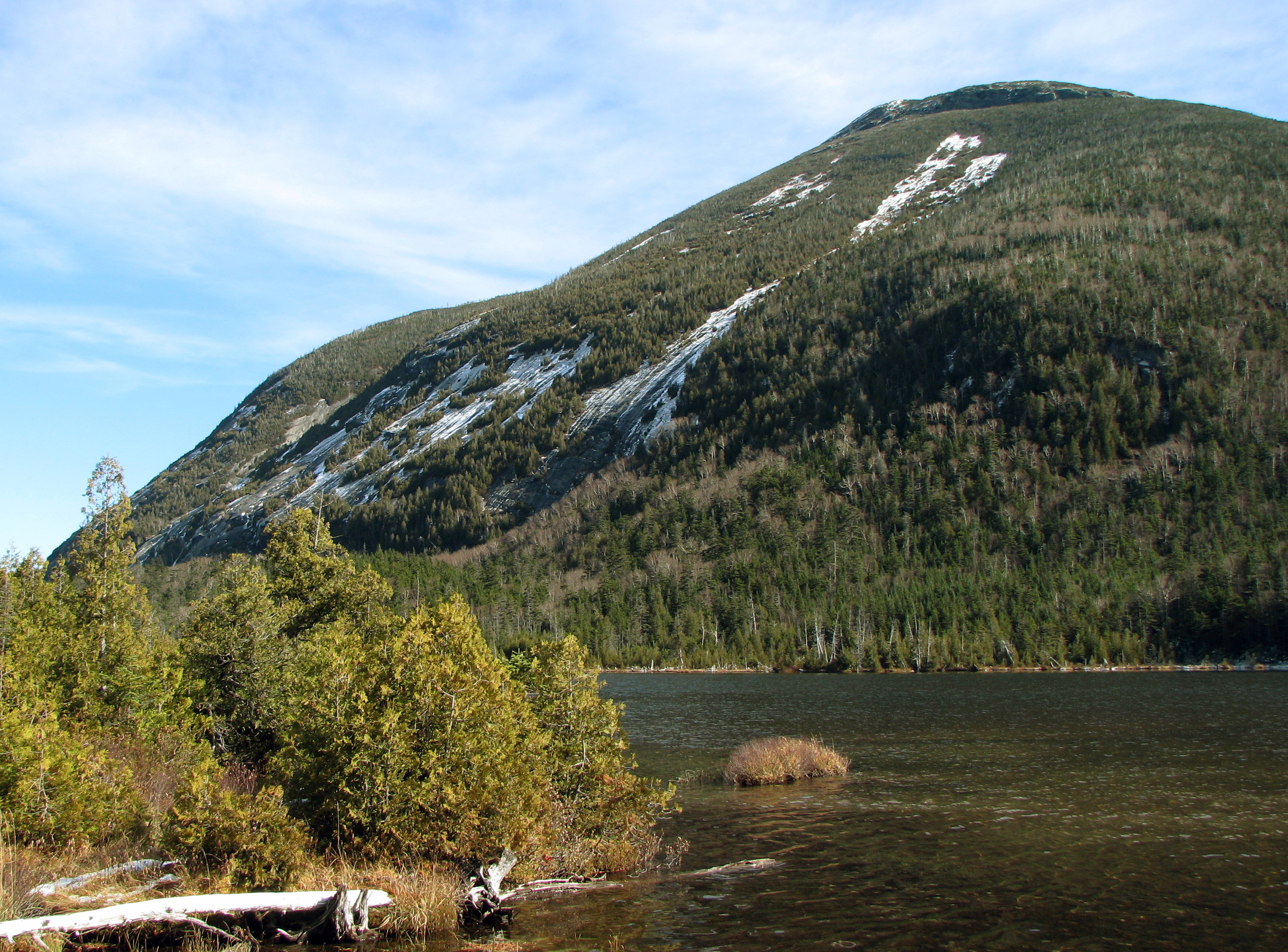
- Lake and Mount Colden from near the Interior Outpost

- Location within New York Location within the United States
- Location: Essex County, New York, United States
- Coordinates: 44°07′21″N 073°58′45″W
- Primary inflows: Avalanche Lake
- Primary outflows: Flowed Lands
- Basin countries: United States
- Max. length: 0.5 miles (0.80 km)
- Max. width: 0.15 miles (0.24 km)
- Surface area: 41 acres (17 ha)
- Surface elevation: 2,764 ft (842 m)
- Islands: none

Lake Colden is a 41-acre (17 ha) lake located in the Adirondack High Peaks in New York, United States. Lake Colden sits at 2,764 feet (842 meters) at the western base of 4,714-foot (1,437 m) Mount Colden. To the northwest lie the MacIntyre Mountains— 5,115-foot (1,559 m) Algonquin Peak (the second highest mountain in the state), 4,829-foot (1,472-meter) Boundary Peak, 4,843-foot (1,476-meter) Iroquois Peak and 4,380-foot (1,340-meter) Mount Marshall. Mount Marcy is 2.8 miles (4.5 km) to the east. Lake Colden is fed by Avalanche Lake, to the northeast and in turn feeds Flowed Lands, to the southwest.

Being in the heart of the High Peaks, the area is very popular with hikers. The New York State Department of Environmental Conservation maintains an Interior Outpost on the western shore. There are a number of campsites and lean-tos in the area.

Lake Colden was named after David C. Colden in 1836; Colden was an investor in the Tahawus iron works of Archibald MacIntyre.

== Images ==
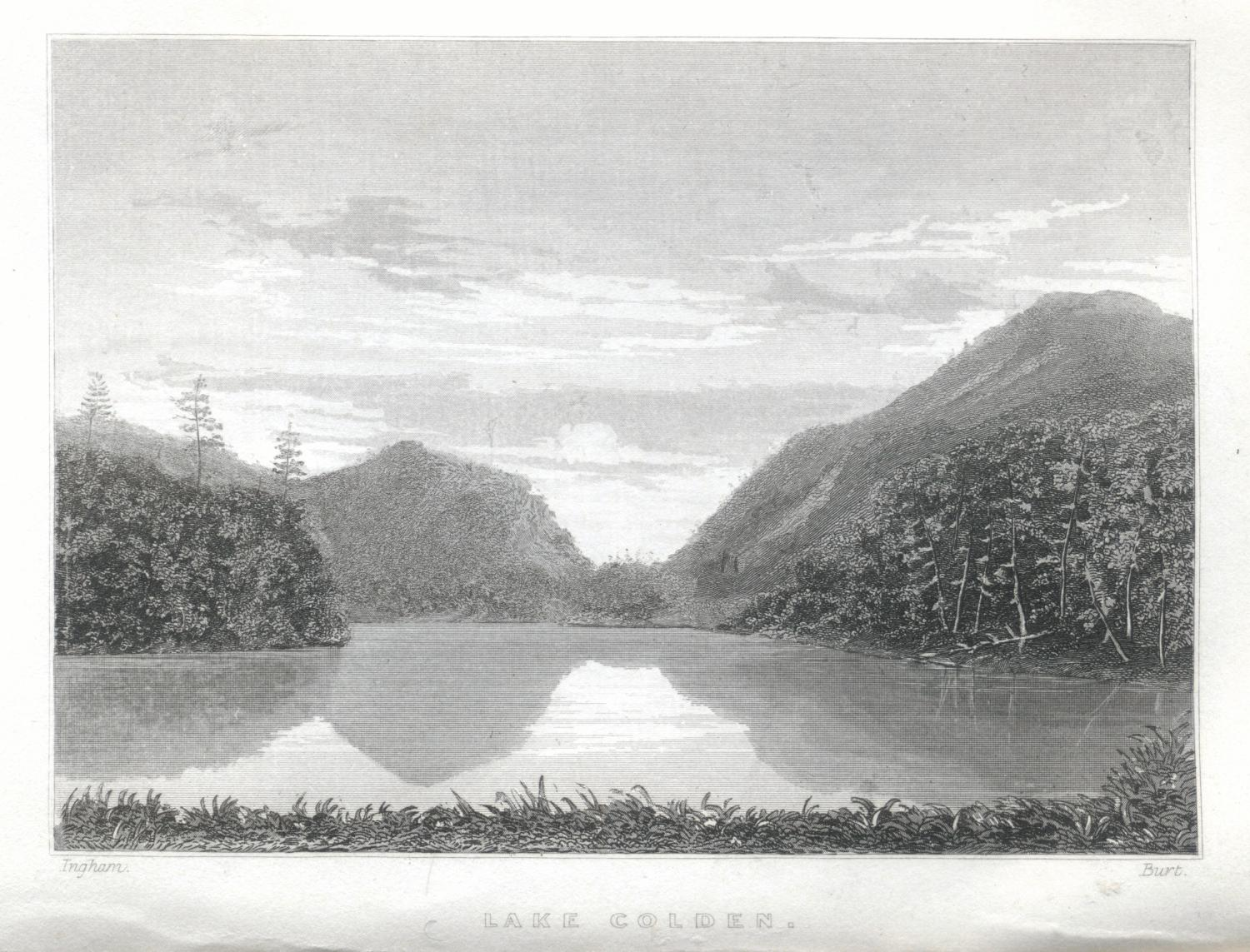
Mt. Colden, Caribou Mt., and Lake Colden as seen from the southwest. From Joel Tyler Headley's The Adirondack; or Life in the Woods (1849)

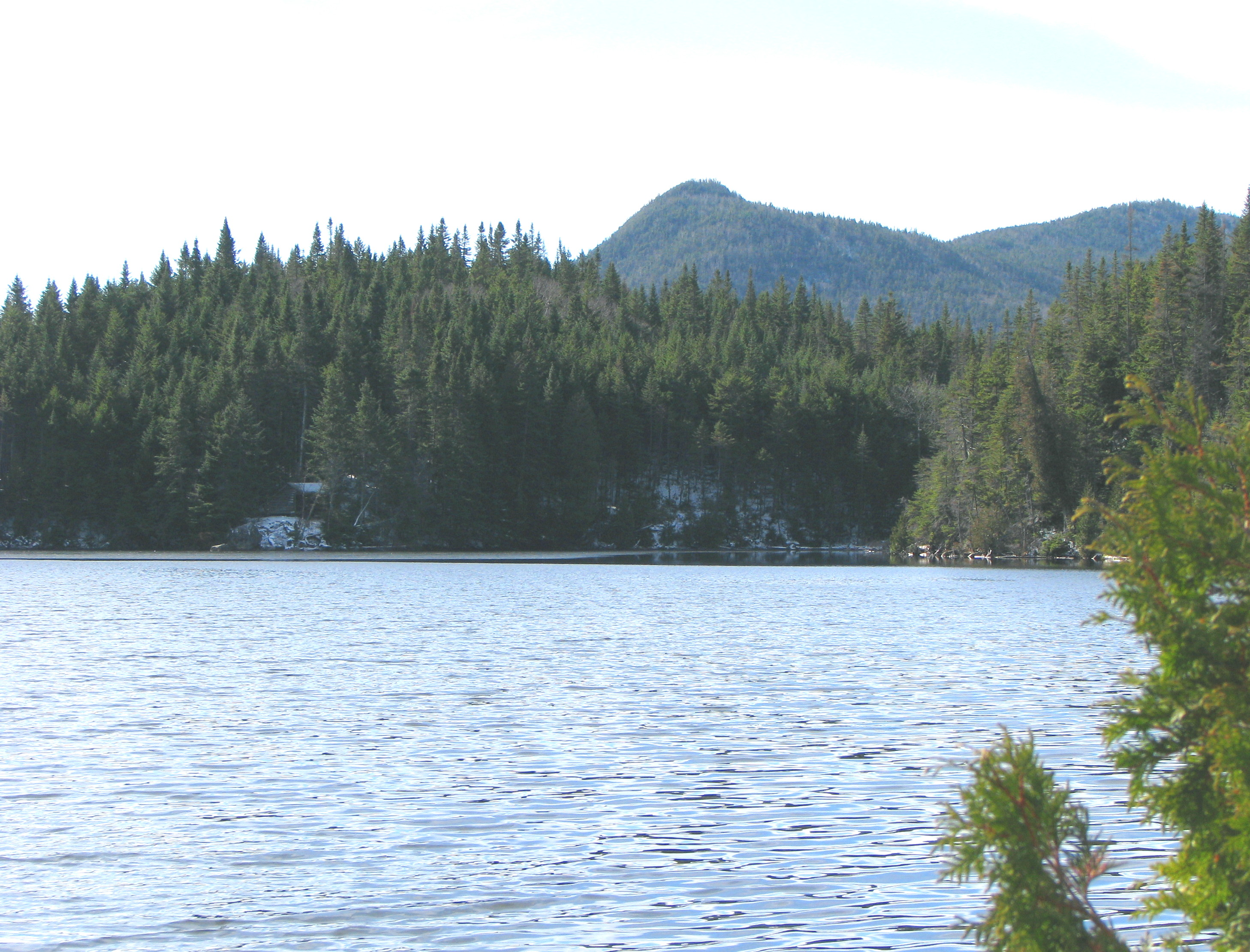
Lake Colden from the Interior Outpost. Cliff Mountain, center; a lean-to is just visible at left.
