= Avalanche Lake (New York) =

Lake in Essex County, New York, USA

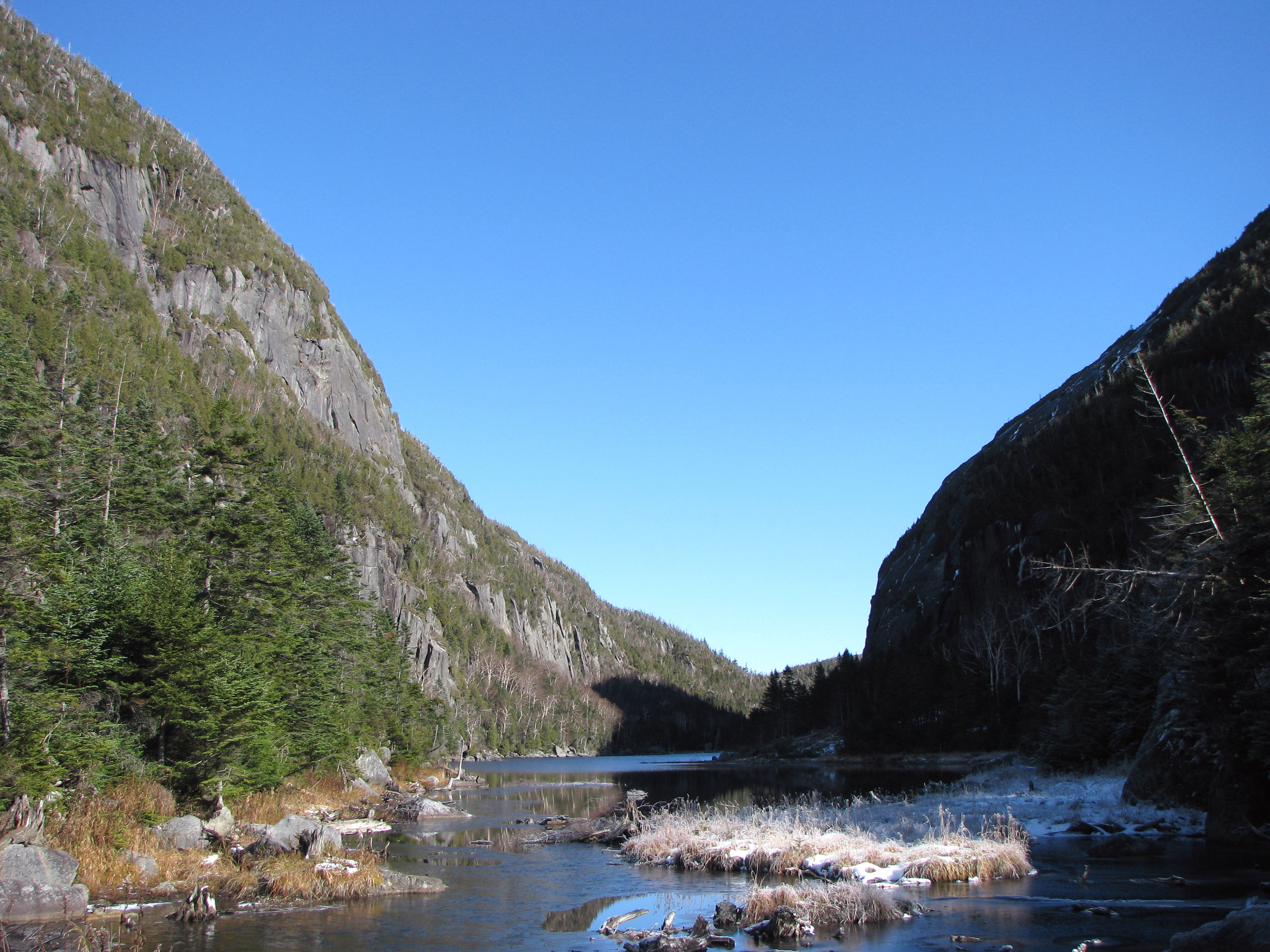
- Avalanche Lake, looking northeast, showing Mount Colden, right, and Avalanche Mountain, left

- Location within New York Location within the United States
- Location: Adirondack High Peaks, Keene, New York, United States
- Coordinates: 44°07′59″N 073°58′04″W
- Primary outflows: Lake Colden
- Basin countries: United States
- Max. length: 0.4 miles (0.64 km)
- Max. width: 250 feet (76 m)
- Surface area: 9 acres (3.6 ha)
- Surface elevation: 2,885 ft (879 m)

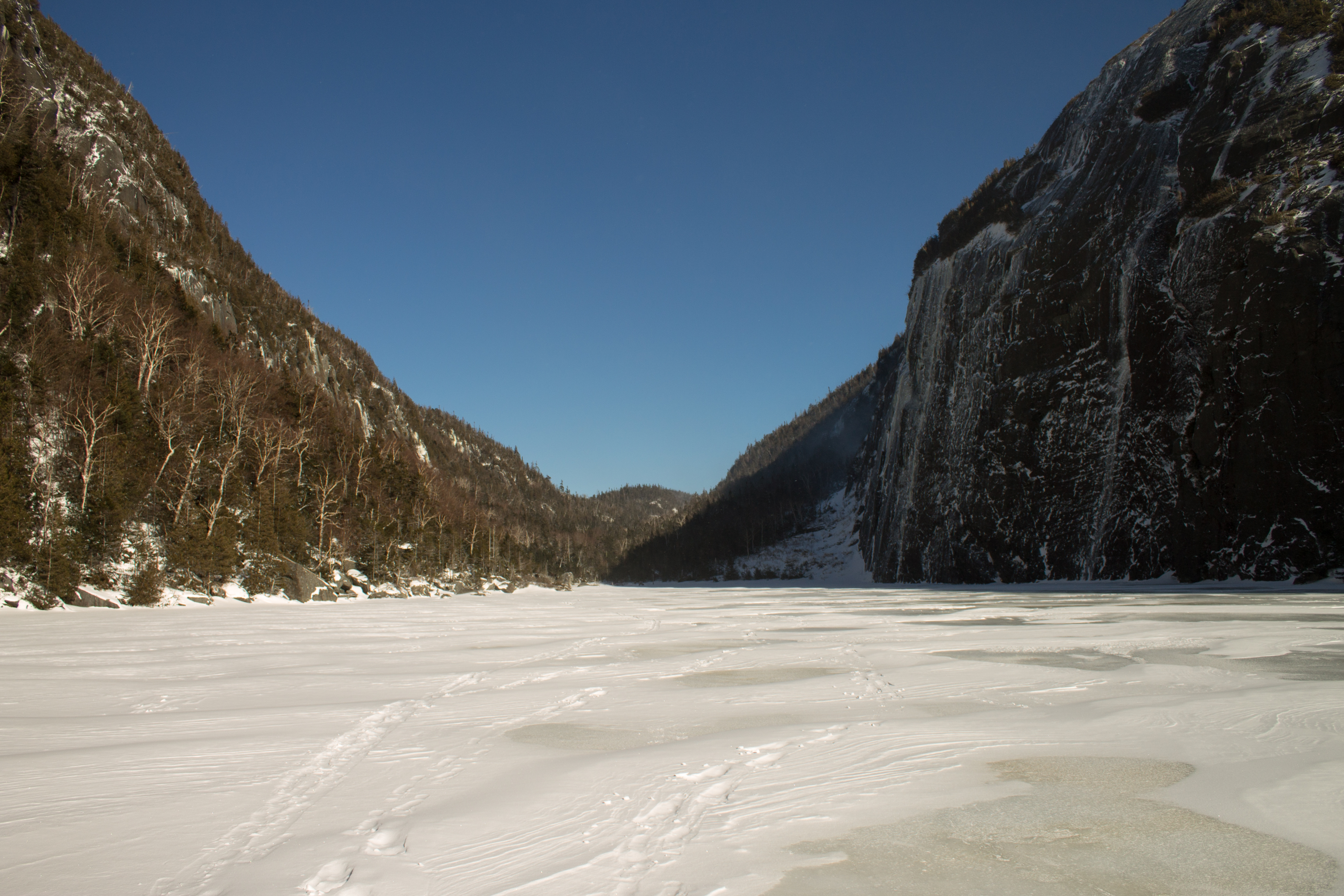
Avalanche Lake frozen over

Avalanche Lake is a 9-acre (3.6 ha) mountain lake located in the Adirondack High Peaks in New York. Avalanche Lake sits at 2,885 feet (879 m) between 4,714-foot (1,437 m) Mount Colden and 3,816-foot (1,163 m) Avalanche Mountain. The two mountains rise in vertical cliffs from the surface of the lake. Immediately west of Avalanche Mountain (formerly known as Caribou Mountain) lies the MacIntyre Range: 5,115-foot (1,559 m) Algonquin Peak (the second highest mountain in the state), 4,829-foot (1,472 m) Boundary Peak, 4,843-foot (1,476 m) Iroquois Peak and 4,380-foot (1,340 m) Mount Marshall. Mount Marcy is 2.5 miles (4.0 km) to the east. Avalanche Lake feeds Lake Colden to the south, in the Hudson River watershed. To the north, the trail to the lake from the Adirondak Loj surmounts Avalanche Pass, which is only slightly above lake level but separates it from the Lake Champlain (St. Lawrence River) watershed. Following the lake toward Lake Colden, the trail is choked with large boulders, and a number of wooden ladders have been built to make passage possible. There are also three places where the trail takes to wooden catwalks, first built in the 1920s, that are bolted directly into the cliff face. This section is known as the "Hitch-Up Matilda;" in 1868 when a mountain guide waded to carry one of his clients past a point with no footing on shore, her husband urged her to sit higher on his shoulders.

== History ==
The European discovery of the lake dates to an 1833 surveying party led by Judge John Richards and Major Reuben Sanford; it was named by William C. Redfield. A large avalanche occurred on August 20, 1869, that created a number of the landslides on Mount Colden, the rubble from which substantially raised the level of the lake. Another avalanche in 1942 caused further slides that raised the lake level by 10 feet (3.0 m).

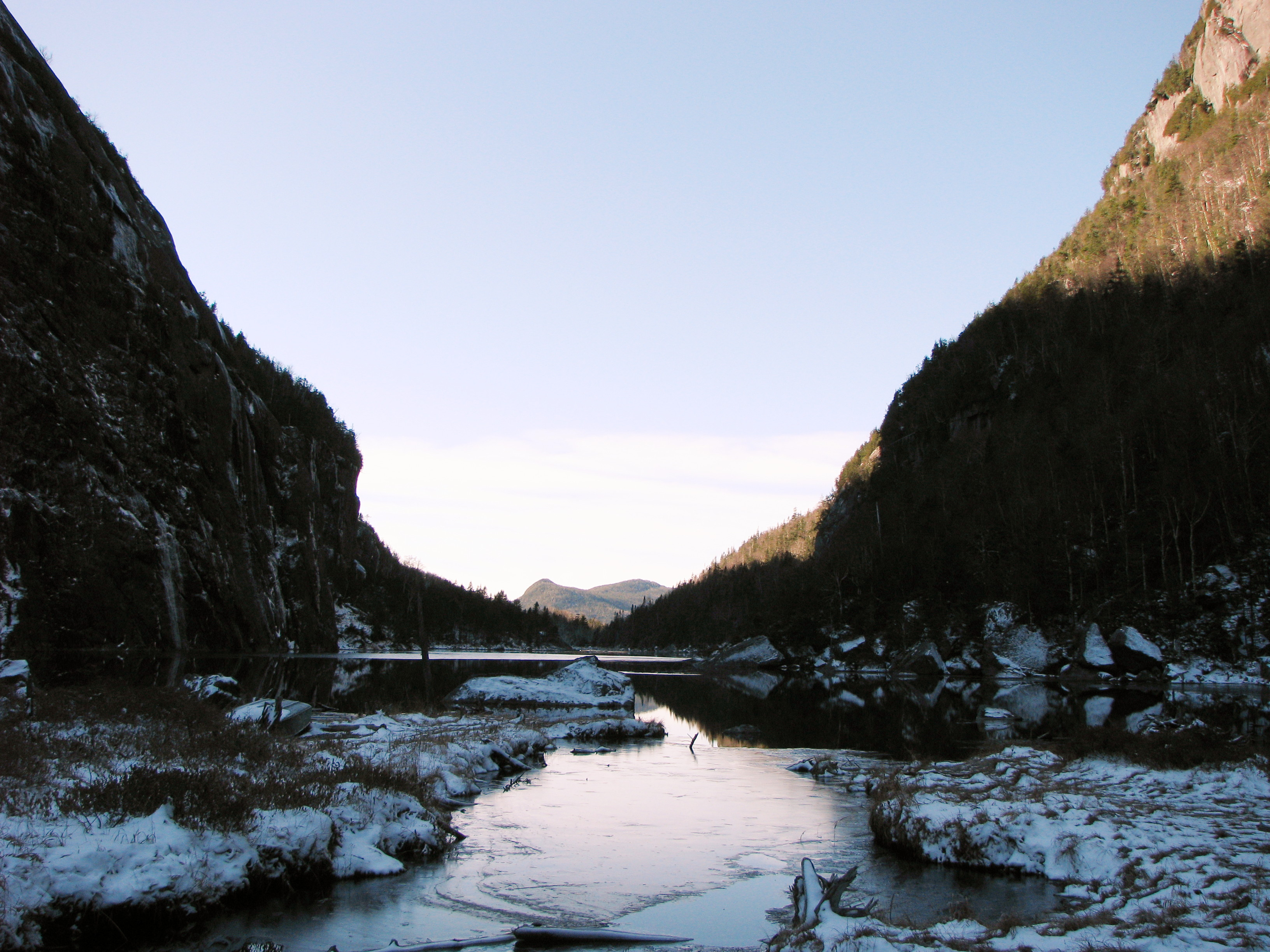
Avalanche Lake looking southwest, Mount Colden, left, Avalanche Mountain, right, Calamity Mountain, center.
