= Ebenezer Emmons =

American geologist

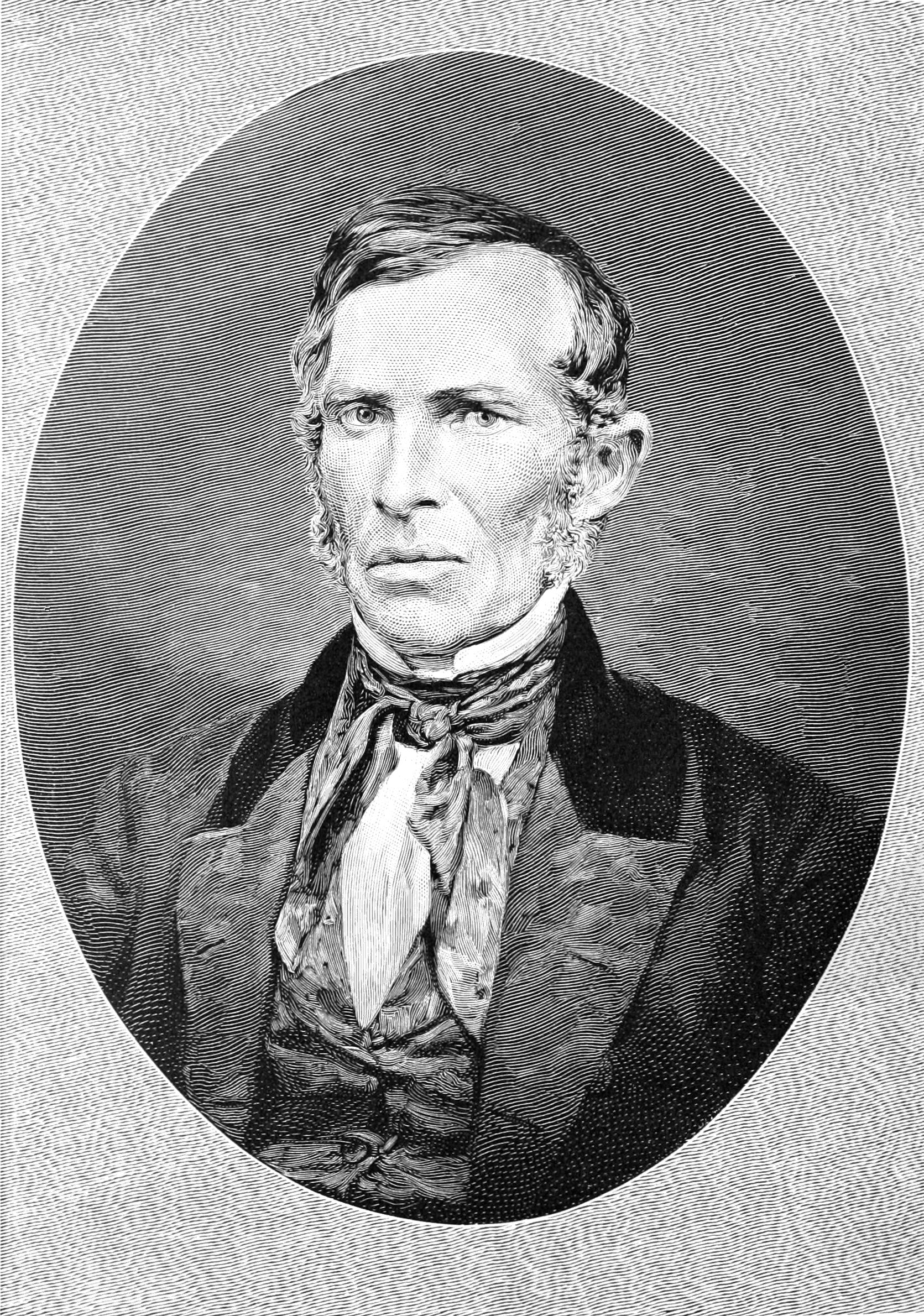
Portrait of Ebenezer Emmons

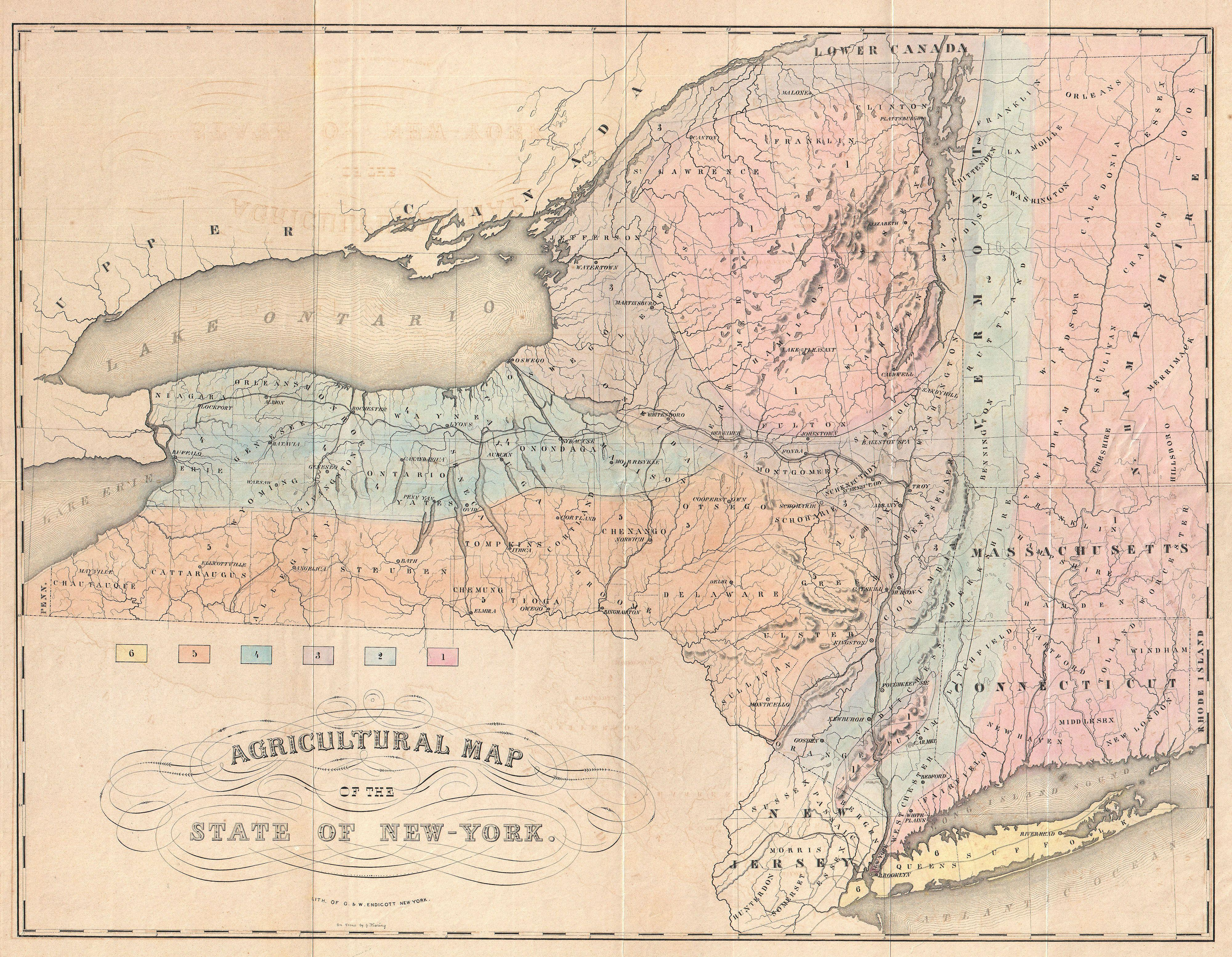
1846 Agricultural Map of the State of "New-York"

Ebenezer Emmons (May 16, 1799 – October 1, 1863), was an American geologist whose work includes the naming of the Adirondack Mountains in New York as well as a first ascent of Mount Marcy.

== Early life ==
Emmons was born at Middlefield, Massachusetts, on May 16, 1799, son of Ebenezer and Mary (Mack) Emmons. Emmons entered Williams College at age 16 and graduated with a degree in medicine in 1818. He went on to study medicine at Albany, New York. After graduating, he practiced as a doctor in Berkshire County, Massachusetts. In 1824, he assisted Chester Dewey in preparing a geological map of Berkshire County, in which the first attempt was made to classify the rocks of the Taconic area. He eventually attended the Rensselaer School (now Rensselaer Polytechnic Institute) for geology. There, he was inspired by professor Amos Eaton, and graduated in the first class in 1826. While giving much of his time to natural science at Williams College, he also became a professor in chemistry and later obstetrics at Albany Medical College.

== Geological Survey of New York ==
Emmons was designated by Jules Marcou as the founder of American Paleozoic stratigraphy, and the first discoverer of the primordial fauna in any country. In 1836, he became attached to the Geological Survey of the State of New York, and after a lengthened study, he grouped the local strata (1842) into the Taconic and overlying New York systems. The latter system was subdivided into several groups that were by no means well defined. Emmons had previously described the Potsdam sandstone (1838), and this was placed at the base of the New York system. It is now regarded as Upper Cambrian.

In 1844, Emmons obtained fossils in his Taconic system for the first time. The species obtained were found to differ from all then-known Palaeozoic fossils and now represent the primordial group. Marcou advocated for the term Taconic to be generally adopted in place of Cambrian. Nevertheless, the Taconic fauna discovered by Emmons proved to include only the lower part of Sedgwick's Cambrian.

Emmons contributed to a series of volumes on the Natural History of New York (1848), writing about agriculture and geological topics. He also issued a work entitled American Geology, containing a statement of the principles of science with full illustrations demonstrating the characteristics of American fossils (1855–1857).

The overthrust in New York, which places Lower Cambrian rocks in contact with Middle Ordovician rocks, is known as Emmons' line, formerly Logan's line after William Edmond Logan. This segment is named after Emmons and extends from Canada through Vermont, New York, and farther south. It traverses through the city of Troy, New York and the Poesten Kill Falls and Gorge. He named the Adirondack Mountains (1838) and Taconic Mountains (1844) and acquainted the public with these regions.

A scientific disagreement with New York State Geologist James Hall regarding the age of the rocks in the Taconic System led Emmons to leave New York State. Emmons held that the Taconic System rocks were of Cambrian age, but Hall was convinced that they were Ordovician in age. (Emmons was ultimately found to be correct.) As a result of the dispute, Emmons was banned from the practice of geology in the state of New York and sued Hall for slander and libel. In 1851, after losing the lawsuit, Emmons was hired by the state of North Carolina for the newly created position of State Geologist. While conducting a state-wide geological survey in 1857, he discovered a jawbone in the Egypt Coal Mine in Lee County that would be categorized as proto-mammal Dromatherium sylvestre. He continued as state geologist until his death in 1863, at his plantation in Brunswick County, North Carolina.

== Adirondack mountain climber ==
Emmons gave the Adirondacks their name in 1838. The name "Adirondacks" is an Anglicized version of the Mohawk ratirontaks, meaning "they eat trees", a derogatory name the Mohawks historically applied to neighboring Algonquian tribes due to their practice of eating the buds and bark of trees when food was scarce.

Emmons led the first recorded climb of Mount Marcy on August 8, 1837. His party was looking for the headwaters of the East Fork of the Hudson River which it claimed was at Lake Tear of the Clouds on the mountain.

Mount Emmons in the Adirondacks is named for him.

== See also ==
- Taconic orogeny
