= Roosevelt–Marcy Trail =

- Length: 35 to 40 miles (56 to 64 km)
- Location: Adirondack Mountains, New York, U.S.

The Roosevelt–Marcy Trail is named for the historic route Vice President Theodore Roosevelt traveled on a midnight stagecoach ride from Tahawus to the North Creek train station to take the Presidential oath.

On September 14, 1901, then-Vice President Theodore Roosevelt was at Lake Tear of the Clouds after returning from a hike to the Mount Marcy summit when he received a message informing him that President William McKinley, who had been shot two weeks earlier but was expected to survive, had taken a turn for the worse. Roosevelt hiked down the mountain to the closest stage station at Long Lake, New York. He then took a 40-mile (64 km) midnight stage coach ride through the Adirondacks to the Adirondack Railway station at North Creek, where he discovered that McKinley had died. Roosevelt took the train to Buffalo, New York, where he was officially sworn in as President. The 40-mile route was later designated the Roosevelt–Marcy Trail.

As written in a newspaper of the time:

When Colonel Roosevelt was reached and informed of the critical condition of the president he could scarcely believe the burden of the message personally delivered to him. Startled at the serious nature of the news, the vice president, at 5:45 o'clock immediately started back for the Tahawas Club. In the meantime the Adirondack stage line placed at his disposal relays of horses covering the thirty-five miles to North Creek. A deluging thunderstorm had rendered the roads unusually heavy. Without any delay he moved as rapidly as possible in the direction of North Creek, the northern terminus of the Adirondacks railroad, where his secretary, William Loeb, Jr., and Superintendent C. D. Hammond, of the Delaware and Hudson railway, with a special train, were awaiting his arrival. Soon after Colonel Roosevelt started night came on and rendered the trip exceedingly difficult and dangerous, as mile after mile was traveled in almost impenetrable darkness, but the expert guides piloted the vice president to his objective point.

The route is in the Adirondack Park region, linking unique history to the scenery. Today, the route is a tourist attraction, attracting many nature enthusiasts for its views of the Adirondack landscape.

The trail begins in Long Lake at New York State Route 30 (NY 30), and follows NY 28N to its eastern end at NY 28 in North Creek. The trail is 40.2 miles (64.7 km) long. The New York State Department of Transportation has declared the Roosevelt–Marcy Trail a byway. There are signs posted along the trail that display "Roosevelt–Marcy Trail".
