= Mount Marcy =

Highest point in New York State

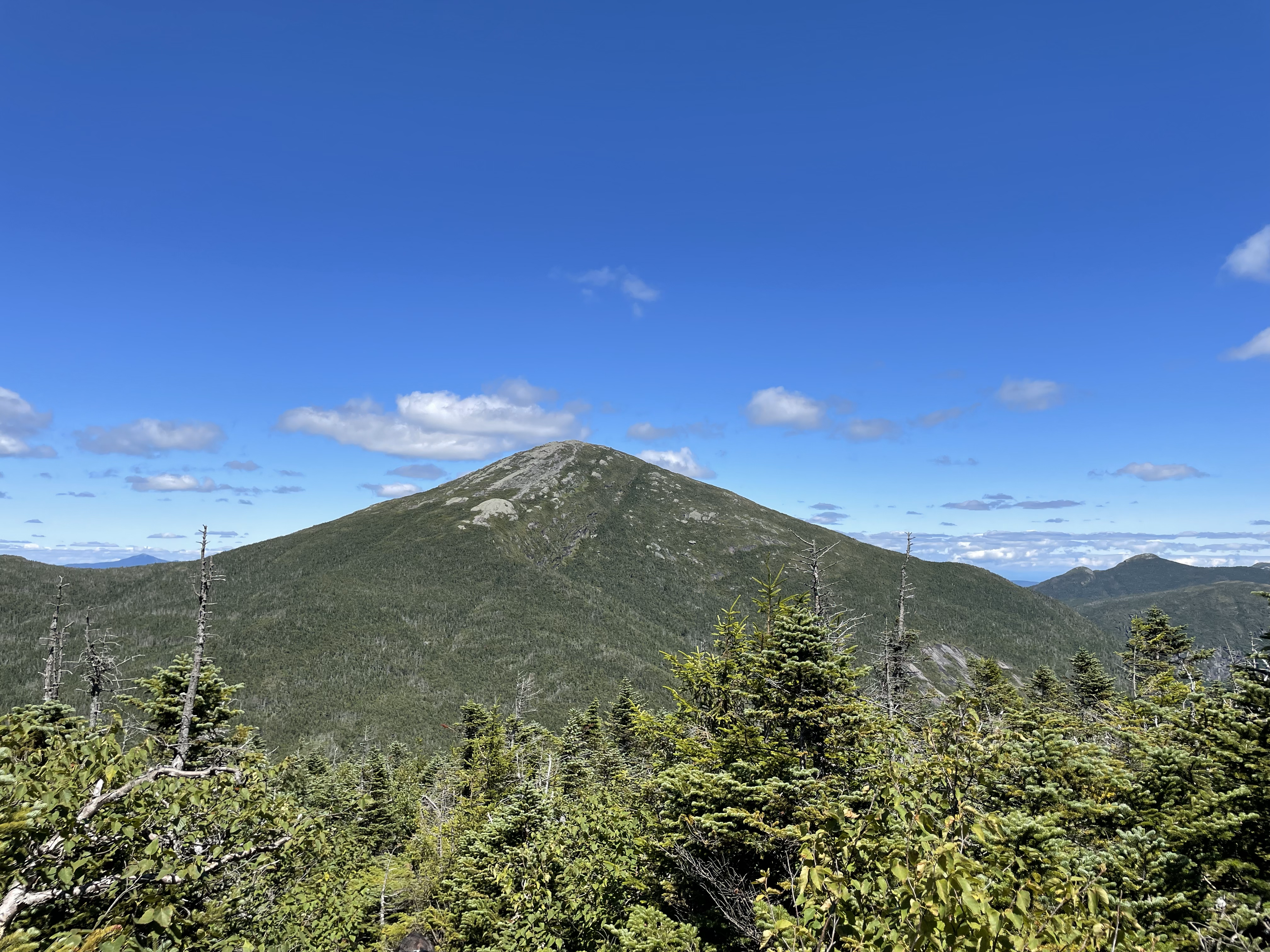
- Mount Marcy (Photo taken from Mount Skylight, looking north)

Highest point
- Elevation: 5,343 ft (1,629 m) NAVD 88
- Listing: North America isolated peaks 99th; U.S. state high point 21st; Adirondack High Peaks 1st; New York County High Points 1st
- Coordinates: 44°06′46″N 73°55′25″W

Naming
- Etymology: Named for William L. Marcy

Geography
- Location within New York Adirondack Park Location within the United States
- Location: Keene, Essex County, New York, U.S.
- Parent range: Adirondack Mountains
- Topo map: USGS Mount Marcy

Climbing
- First ascent: August 5, 1837, by Ebenezer Emmons and party (Note: Other members of the party included his son Ebenezer Emmons Jr., scientist William Charles Redfield, assistant state geologist James Hall, artist Charles C. Ingham, state botanist John Torrey, businessman David Henderson, guides John Cheney and Harvey Holt, and three unknown guides. Previous ascents may have been made by Indigenous Americans but have not been recorded.)
- Easiest route: Hike (Van Hoevenberg Trail)

Mount Marcy is the highest point in the Adirondack Mountains and the U.S. state of New York, with an elevation of 5,343.2 feet (1,628.6 m). It is located in the town of Keene in Essex County. The mountain is in the heart of the High Peaks Wilderness Area in Adirondack Park. Like the surrounding Adirondack Mountains, Marcy was heavily affected by large glaciers during recent ice ages, which deposited boulders on the mountain slopes and carved valleys and depressions on the mountain. One such depression is today filled by Lake Tear of the Clouds, which is often cited as the highest source of the Hudson River. The majority of the mountain is covered by hardwood and spruce-fir forests, although the highest few hundred feet are above the tree line. The peak is dominated by rocky outcrops, lichens, and alpine plants. The mountain supports a diverse number of woodland mammals and birds.

Mount Marcy's stature and expansive views make it a popular destination for hikers, who crowd its summit in the summer months. Multiple approaches to the summit are available from the north and south, with the most popular route being the Van Hoevenberg Trail. The first recorded ascent of the mountain was made by a party led by Ebenezer Emmons on August 5, 1837, who named it after New York governor William L. Marcy. One of the mountain's most notable ascents was made in 1901, when Theodore Roosevelt climbed it with his family, and learned during his descent that William McKinley was dying and he was to become President of the United States.

== Name ==
The mountain was known as Wah-um-de-neg, meaning "always white", in the Missisquoi Abenaki Tribe. Another Abenaki name for it and the surrounding mountains was Wawobadenik, meaning "white mountains". The contemporary name Mount Marcy was provided by Ebenezer Emmons following his ascent of the mountain in August 1837. The mountain is named after William L. Marcy, the 19th-century Governor of New York, who authorized the environmental survey that explored the area. In September 1837, the area was visited by poet and author Charles Fenno Hoffman, who proposed the alternative name Tahawus, a Seneca term which has been translated as "cloud-splitter" or "he splits the sky". The alternative name became popular during the 19th century, and the nearby village at Lower Works was renamed Tahawus in 1847. Many New Yorkers advocated for it to become the official name. A misconception arose that this was an original indigenous name for the peak, although there is no documented use of it prior to Hoffman. (Note: Russell Carson and Arthur C. Parker found the name Tahawus, along with other Seneca terms that Hoffman had used for various Adirondack locations, in one section of an 1827 book titled An Account of Sundry Missions Performed Among the Senecas and Munsees by Rev. Timothy Alden, President of Allegheny College, and concluded Hoffman had used the book as his source.)

== Geography ==
Mount Marcy is the highest point in New York, the highest peak in the Adirondack Mountains, and the highest of the Adirondack High Peaks, with an elevation of 5,343.1 feet (1,628.6 m). The mountain is located in the High Peaks Wilderness Area, in the town of Keene in Essex County. Three shorter peaks are located on the flanks of Marcy: Gray Peak 0.6 miles (0.97 km) to the west, Little Marcy 0.8 miles (1.3 km) to the northeast, and an unnamed peak 1.2 miles (1.9 km) to the northwest. Lake Tear of the Clouds, at the col between Mounts Marcy and Skylight, is often cited as the highest source of the Hudson River. Between Mount Marcy and Mount Haystack lies Panther Gorge. A large rock slide on the southern slope of the mountain, now called the Old Slide, was incorporated into the first cut trail to the summit, which approached from Panther Gorge.

=== Geology ===
Mount Marcy is composed of anorthosite rock formed approximately 1.1 billion years ago. During the Pleistocene Epoch, large glaciers formed across the Adirondack Mountains, carving new valleys and depositing erratic rocks across the mountains. The last glacial retreat of the Pleistocene occurred 12,000 years ago. Numerous cirques were left on the mountain slopes by water as it repeatedly froze and thawed, including a depression on the northeast slope known as the snowbowl, and another on the south slope which has now been filled by Lake Tear of the Clouds. The mountain, along with the surrounding Adirondack region, is currently rising at a rate of 2-3 millimeters per year.

== History ==
The earliest recorded ascent of Mount Marcy was on August 5, 1837, by a large party led by state geologist Ebenezer Emmons measuring the highest peaks in the region. Interest in recreational climbs of the mountain increased after 1849, when mountain guide Orson Schofield Phelps moved to the area. Phelps would ascend the mountain over 100 times and cut the first two trails to the peak.

Surveying teams led by Verplanck Colvin made several important ascents of Mount Marcy in the 1870s. Colvin's team measured the mountain's elevation by leveling in 1875, and a signal tower was erected at the summit in 1877. After observing the effects of deforestation during his travels in the Adirondacks, Colvin proposed the creation of a park in the mountains. Most of the Adirondack region, including Mount Marcy, had been sold to private landowners shortly after the American Revolution. In 1870, journalist and preservationist Kate Field attempted to purchase the summit in 1870 for conservation purposes, but was rebuffed by the owners. In 1922, the state of New York acquired the land containing the summit to add to the state forest preserve.

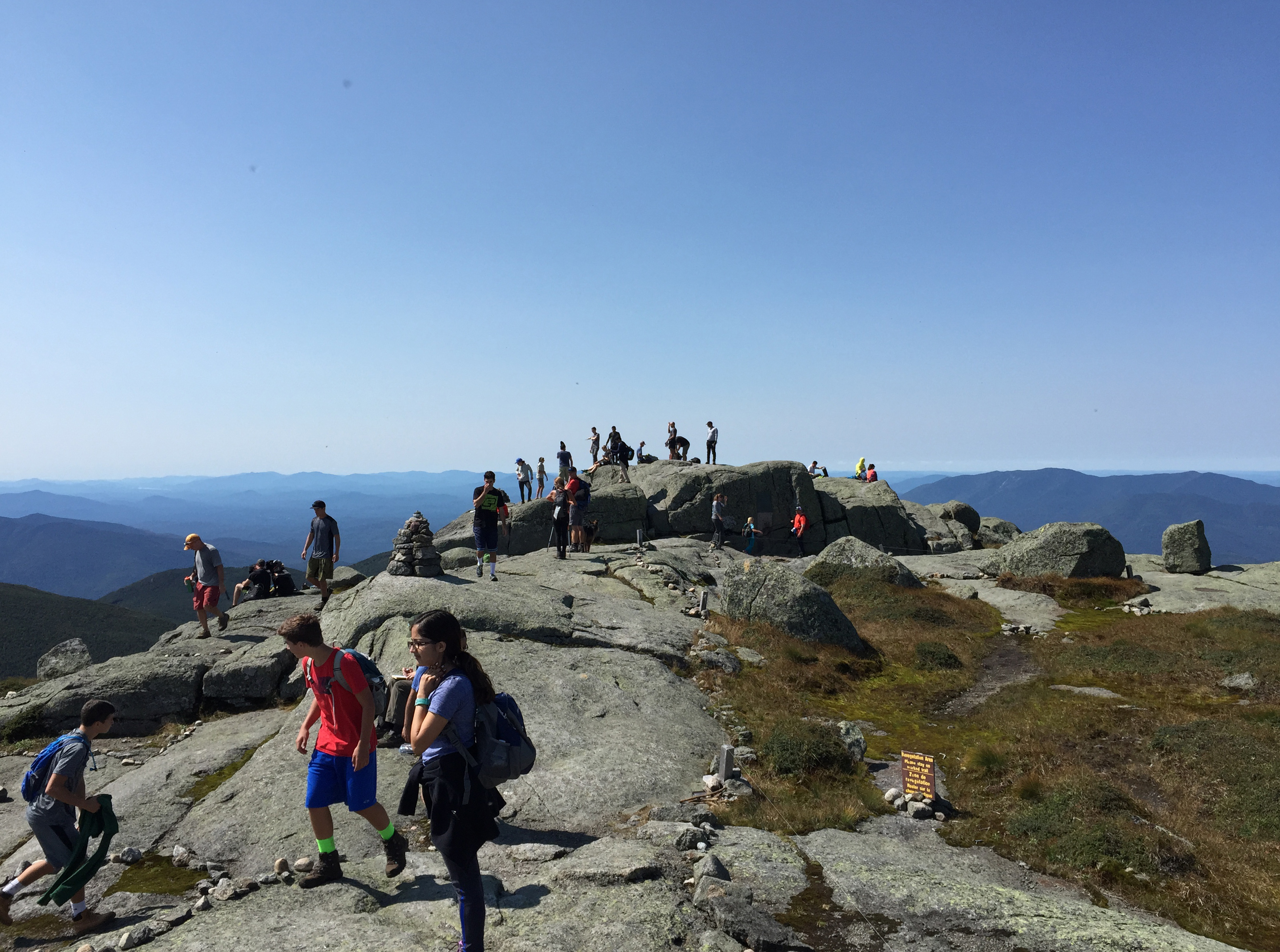
Hikers on the summit during a summer weekend

Vice President Theodore Roosevelt was on a vacation in the Adirondacks when President William McKinley was shot by an assassin on September 6, 1901. Roosevelt rushed to Buffalo to see the president, but believed he would recover and resumed his trip. On September 13, when it became clear McKinley was dying, Roosevelt was staying at Tahawus, and spent the morning ascending Mount Marcy with his family. A messenger had to be dispatched to deliver the news and reached the party at Lake Tear of the Clouds during their descent. They hiked back to their lodge, where Roosevelt hired a stage coach to take him to the North Creek train station. There, Roosevelt was informed that McKinley had died, and the new president took the train to Buffalo to be sworn in. The route from Long Lake to North Creek has been designated as the Roosevelt-Marcy Trail.

Marcy's popularity as a hiking destination has steadily increased in recent decades, conflicting with the goal of keeping the mountain and the surrounding area as wilderness. The number of registered visitors at trailheads in the High Peaks Wilderness increased from 57,016 in 1988 to 139,663 in 1998, prompting the New York State Department of Environmental Conservation to formulate the High Peaks Unit Management Plan in March 1999. A 2021 study by Otak observed significant crowds on the summit of the mountain on popular summer days.

== Routes ==
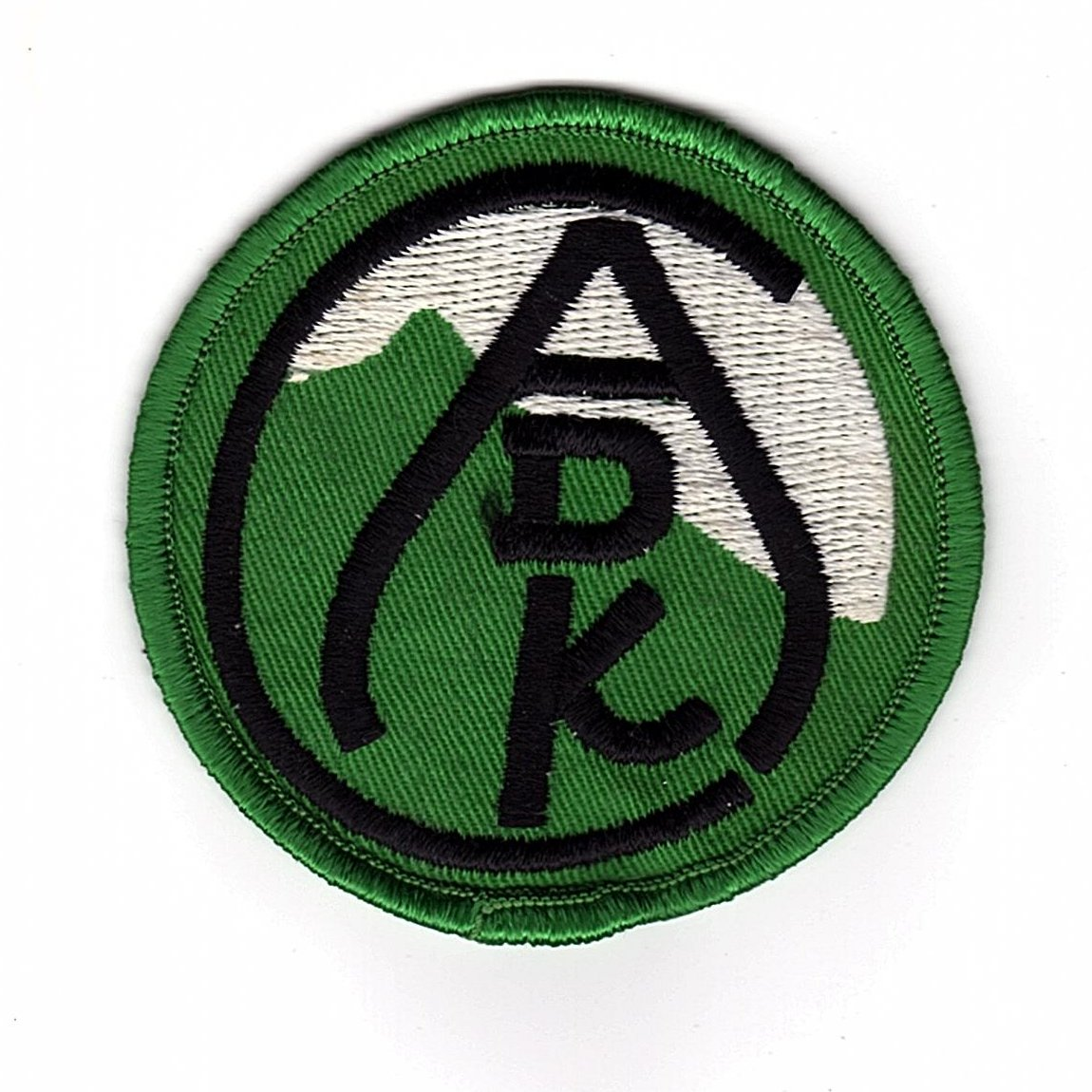
Badge award for Mount Marcy climb (early 1970s)

The shortest and most frequently used route up the mountain is from the northwest on the Van Hoevenberg Trail. The trail starts at the Adirondak Loj near Heart Lake and proceeds 7.4 miles (11.9 km) to the summit. Marcy Dam is located on the route 2.3 miles (3.7 km) from the trailhead along with campsites. This route involves a gain of 3,166 feet (965 m) in elevation from the trailhead to summit. Portions of the trail can be used for alpine skiing in the winter.

A second ascent route approaches from the northeast, via the Phelps Trail in Johns Brook Valley, which merges with the Van Hoevenberg Trail shortly before the peak. Beginning at the Garden parking lot in Keene Valley, this route is 9.1 miles (14.6 km) to the summit. The Johns Brook Lodge, the closest lodging to the mountain, is located 3.5 miles (5.6 km) from the trailhead. This route involves a gain of 3,821 feet (1,165 m) in elevation. The mountain can also be ascended at the end of the Great Range Trail, which begins at the Rooster Comb trailhead in Keene Valley. This route is much more challenging and crosses the summits of the Great Range before merging with the Van Hoevenberg Trail, for a total distance of 14.5 miles (23.3 km) one way and 9,000 feet (2,700 m) of cumulative elevation gain.

A lengthier southern approach can be made from the Upper Works trailhead via the Calamity Brook Trail. The route passes Lake Colden and Lake Tear of the Clouds on the way to the summit, and can also be used for skiing in the winter. This approach is 10.3 miles (16.6 km) to the summit and there are several campsites along the route. Less commonly, a southern approach can be made from the Elk Lake parking lot on the Elk Lake-Marcy Trail. This trail crosses private land and is closed during the big-game hunting season. The route is 11.0 miles (17.7 km) to the summit and involves a gain of 4,200 feet (1,300 m) of elevation. A lean-to is available for camping at Panther Gorge, located 8.7 miles (14.0 km) from the trailhead. The two southern routes meet at the Four Corners intersection at the col between Mounts Marcy and Skylight, from which both peaks can be accessed.

On clear days, 43 of the other 45 High Peaks are visible from the peak of Marcy. Lake Champlain can be seen to the east, and Mount Royal in Quebec can be seen to the north, 65 miles (105 km) away.

== Climate ==
Mount Marcy has a warm-summer humid continental climate (Dfb) as defined by the Köppen climate classification system, closely bordering on subarctic.

Climate data for Mount Marcy, 1991–2020 normals (elevation 4,642 ft (1,415 m)), 1981–2018 extremes (elevation 3,825 ft (1,166 m))
Month	Jan	Feb	Mar	Apr	May	Jun	Jul	Aug	Sep	Oct	Nov	Dec	Year
Record high °F (°C)	54.3 (12.4)	55.0 (12.8)	70.5 (21.4)	80.8 (27.1)	82.8 (28.2)	84.2 (29.0)	85.4 (29.7)	85.7 (29.8)	84.6 (29.2)	74.6 (23.7)	62.9 (17.2)	57.1 (13.9)	85.7 (29.8)
Mean daily maximum °F (°C)	18.1 (−7.7)	19.6 (−6.9)	26.8 (−2.9)	42.2 (5.7)	54.5 (12.5)	63.0 (17.2)	67.2 (19.6)	66.0 (18.9)	60.5 (15.8)	47.9 (8.8)	32.6 (0.3)	23.4 (−4.8)	43.5 (6.4)
Daily mean °F (°C)	10.1 (−12.2)	11.5 (−11.4)	19.0 (−7.2)	32.4 (0.2)	44.9 (7.2)	54.1 (12.3)	58.7 (14.8)	57.4 (14.1)	51.5 (10.8)	39.4 (4.1)	26.1 (−3.3)	16.5 (−8.6)	35.1 (1.7)
Mean daily minimum °F (°C)	2.1 (−16.6)	3.4 (−15.9)	11.2 (−11.6)	22.7 (−5.2)	35.4 (1.9)	45.1 (7.3)	50.1 (10.1)	48.8 (9.3)	42.5 (5.8)	30.9 (−0.6)	19.7 (−6.8)	9.7 (−12.4)	26.8 (−2.9)
Record low °F (°C)	−36.0 (−37.8)	−32.0 (−35.6)	−28.7 (−33.7)	−3.5 (−19.7)	19.0 (−7.2)	22.4 (−5.3)	31.9 (−0.1)	29.6 (−1.3)	20.3 (−6.5)	10.5 (−11.9)	−14.4 (−25.8)	−29.7 (−34.3)	−36.0 (−37.8)
Average precipitation inches (mm)	5.20 (132)	4.01 (102)	5.40 (137)	6.52 (166)	7.01 (178)	7.68 (195)	7.38 (187)	7.13 (181)	6.68 (170)	7.71 (196)	6.30 (160)	6.16 (156)	77.18 (1,960)
Average dew point °F (°C)	6.2 (−14.3)	6.7 (−14.1)	12.6 (−10.8)	20.8 (−6.2)	34.3 (1.3)	46.1 (7.8)	51.2 (10.7)	50.7 (10.4)	44.6 (7.0)	32.3 (0.2)	21.1 (−6.1)	13.0 (−10.6)	28.3 (−2.1)
Source: PRISM

== Ecology ==
=== Flora ===
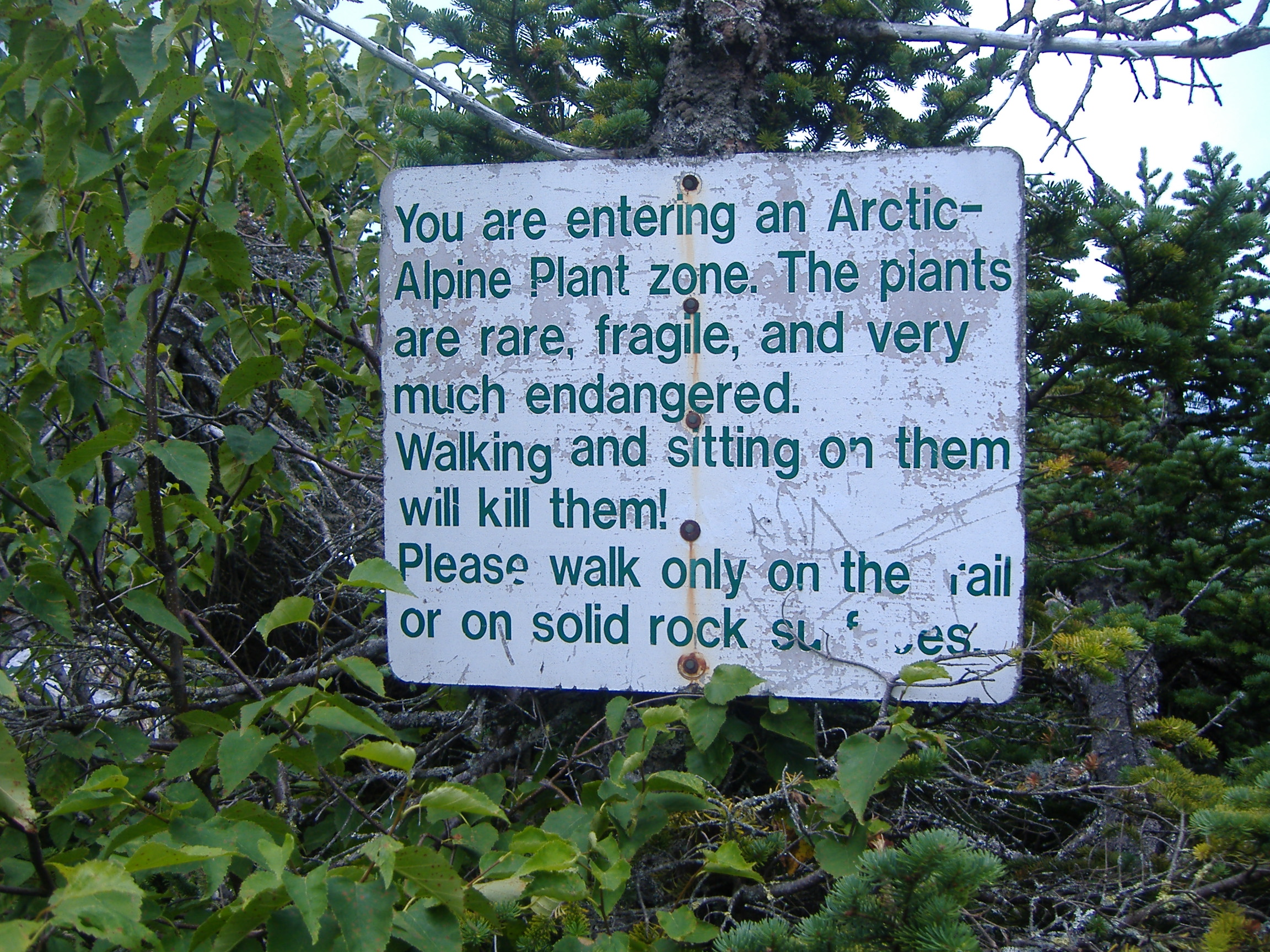
A sign warning hikers at the edge of the alpine zone

The lower slopes of Mount Marcy are covered by hardwood forests containing American beech, sugar maple, and yellow birch trees. The upper slopes contain balsam fir and red spruce. Above an elevation of 4,200 feet (1,300 m), only the balsam fir grows. The cold and windy climate near the summit creates a krummholz zone with short, crooked trees and large areas of exposed rock where no plants can take root, although lichens will grow on the rocks.

About 18 acres (7.3 hectares) near the summit is covered by alpine tundra vegetation where trees cannot grow, a remnant of the tundra ecosystem which covered the entire region at the end of the last ice age and retreated uphill as the climate warmed. This small ecosystem is primarily covered by sphagnum moss and is home to other alpine plants, including alpine bilberry, cottongrass, Labrador tea, Lapland rosebay, and leatherleaf. Botanist Edwin Ketchledge conducted an ecological study of the summits in the late 1960s and concluded the alpine plants were being destroyed by litter and trampling from hikers, after which habitat restoration projects were carried out in the 1970s. The Summit Steward program was established to educate hikers against wandering off the trails and to mark the trails to the summit with cairns. A long-term study between 1957 and 1981 found that away from the hiking trails and direct human impact, the alpine ecosystem was stable over long periods of time.

=== Fauna ===
A variety of birds can be found in the spruce-fir forests of the upper slopes, including black-backed woodpeckers, golden-crowned kinglets, and white-winged crossbills, as well as mammals such as pine martens, porcupines, and red squirrels. Despite the harsh climate, the summit of Marcy is still home to many animals. Birds that frequent the alpine zone of the High Peaks include common ravens, dark-eyed juncos, white-throated sparrows, winter wrens, and several species of warbler. Mammals that live in the alpine zone include American ermines, long-tailed shrews, and snowshoe hares. The alpine meadows support pollinating insects, and bees, butterflies, flies, and wasps can be found in the summer. Several species of leafhopper have been identified, some of which are endemic to alpine environments.

== Gallery ==
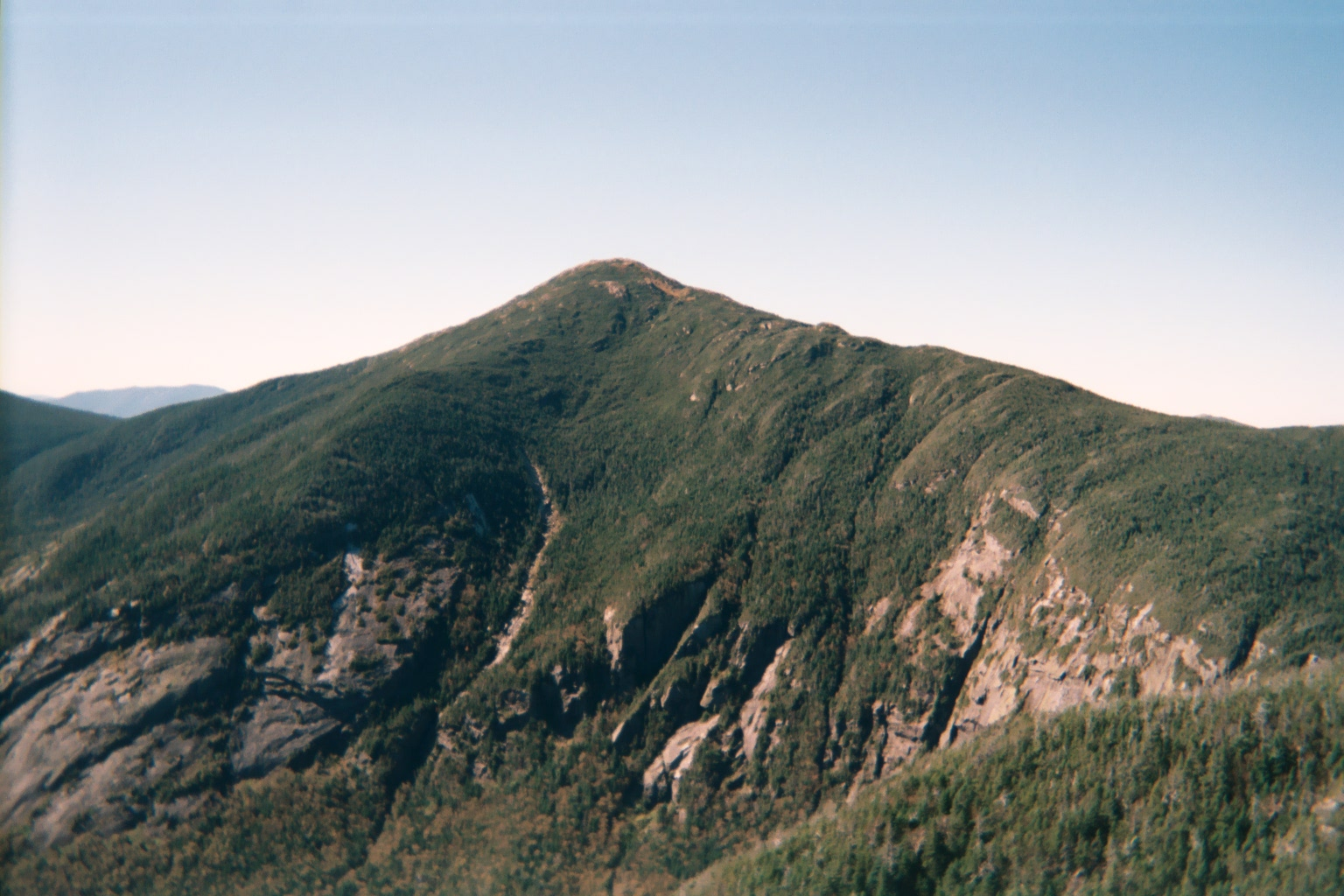
Mount Marcy seen from Mount Haystack, looking across Panther Gorge

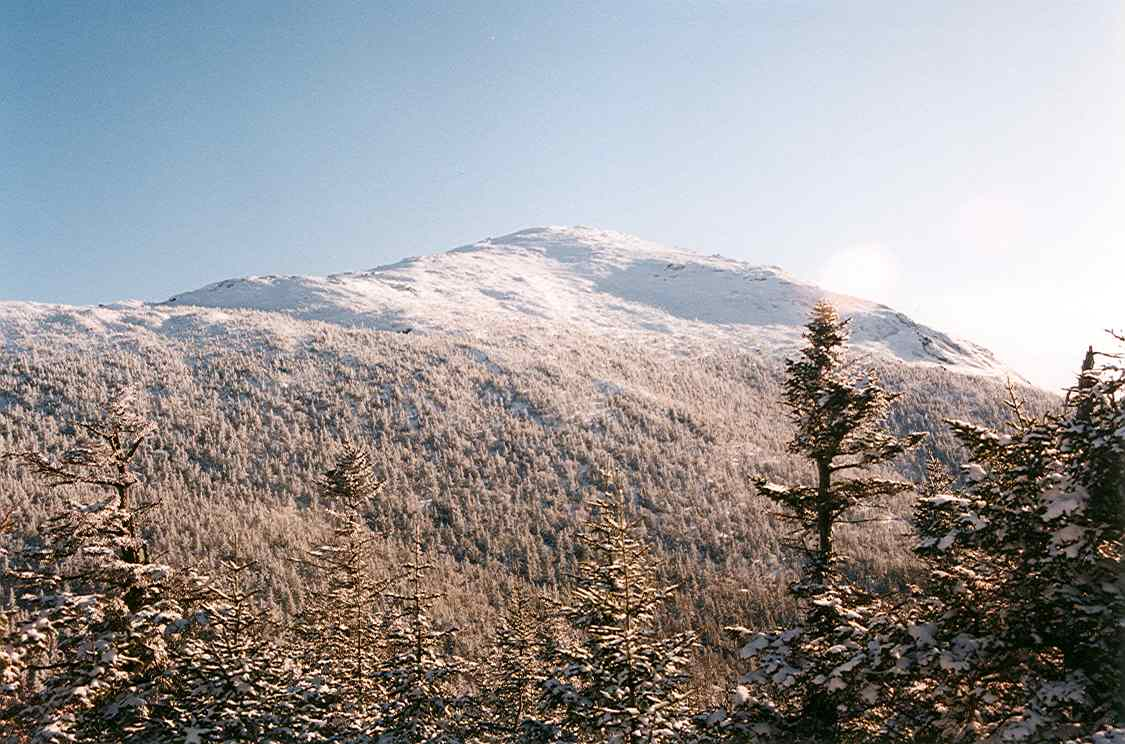
Summit of Mount Marcy seen from near Mount Skylight

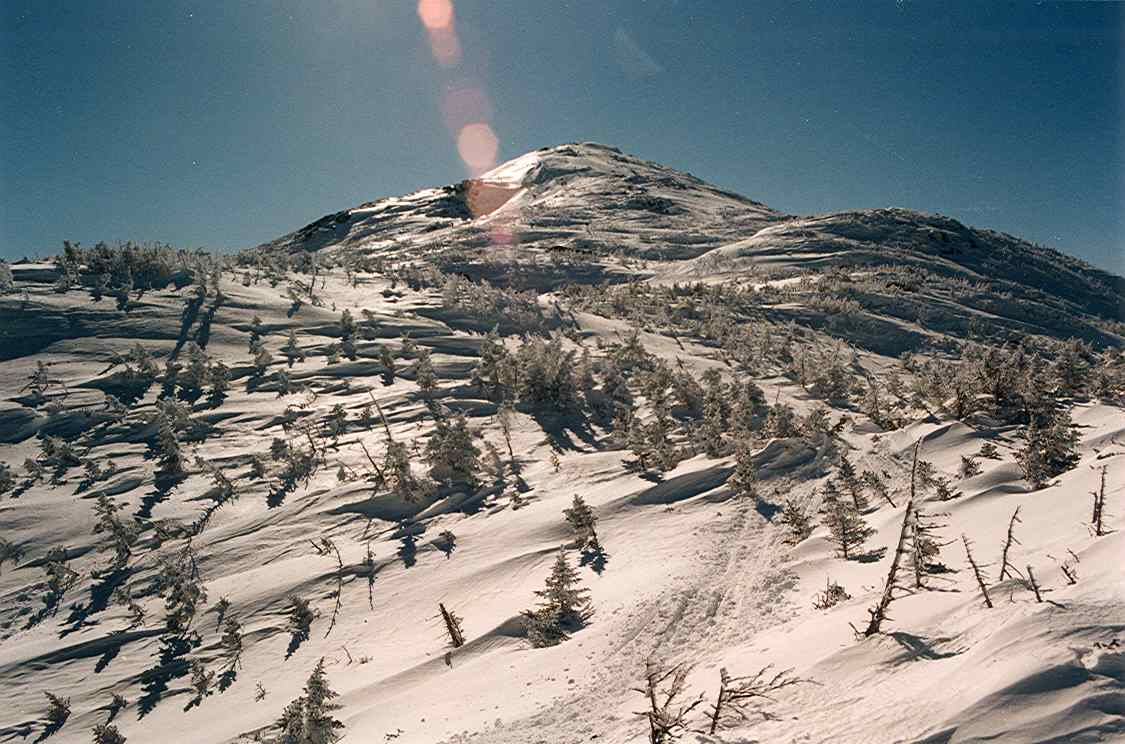
Mount Marcy summit

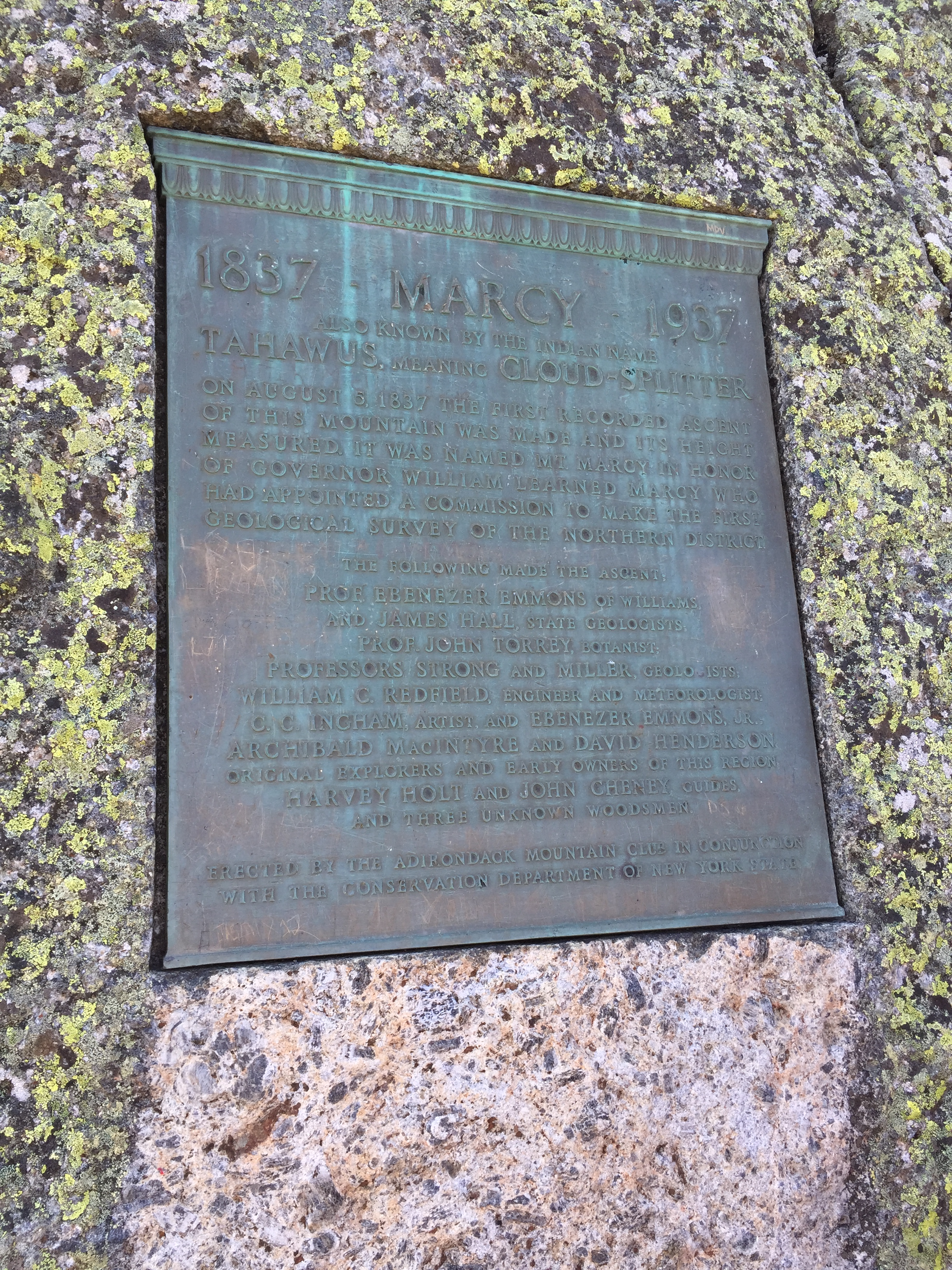
A historical plaque at the peak

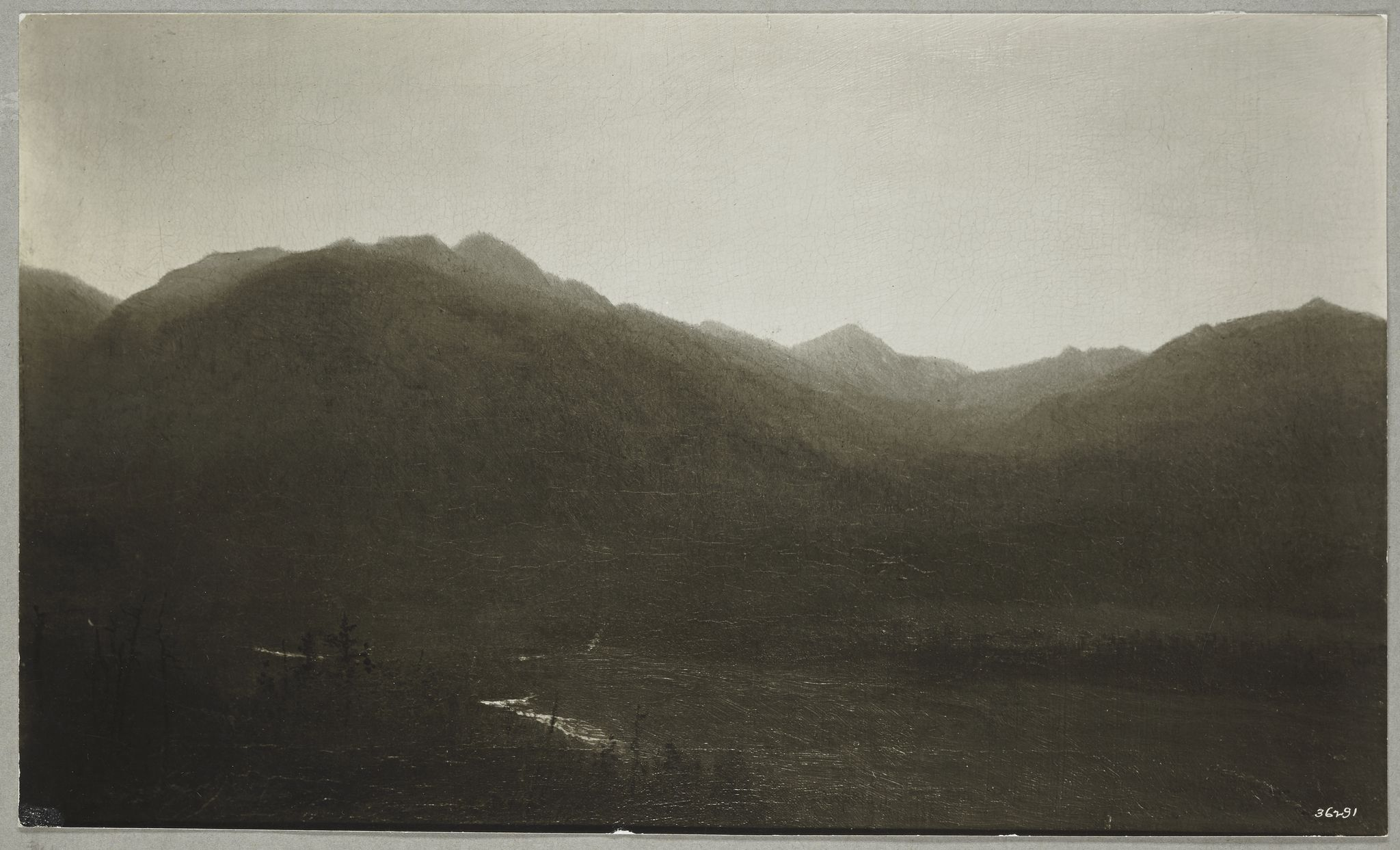
Ausable Valley and Mt. Marcy (1866), oil on canvas by Homer Dodge Martin found at the Frick Art Research Library Photoarchive
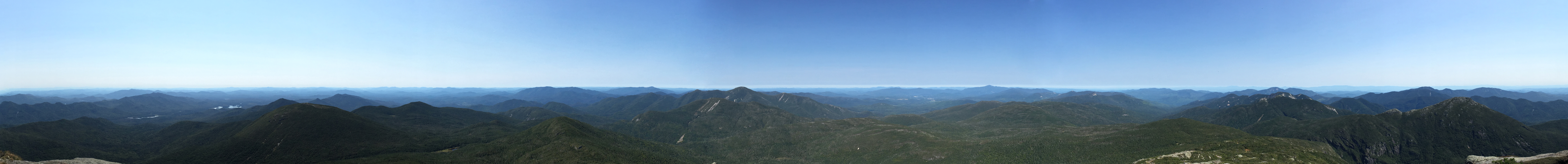
360-degree photo-stitch panorama from the summit

== See also ==
- List of mountain peaks of North America
  - List of mountain peaks of the United States
    - List of U.S. states by elevation
