= Flowed Lands =

Lake in New York, United States

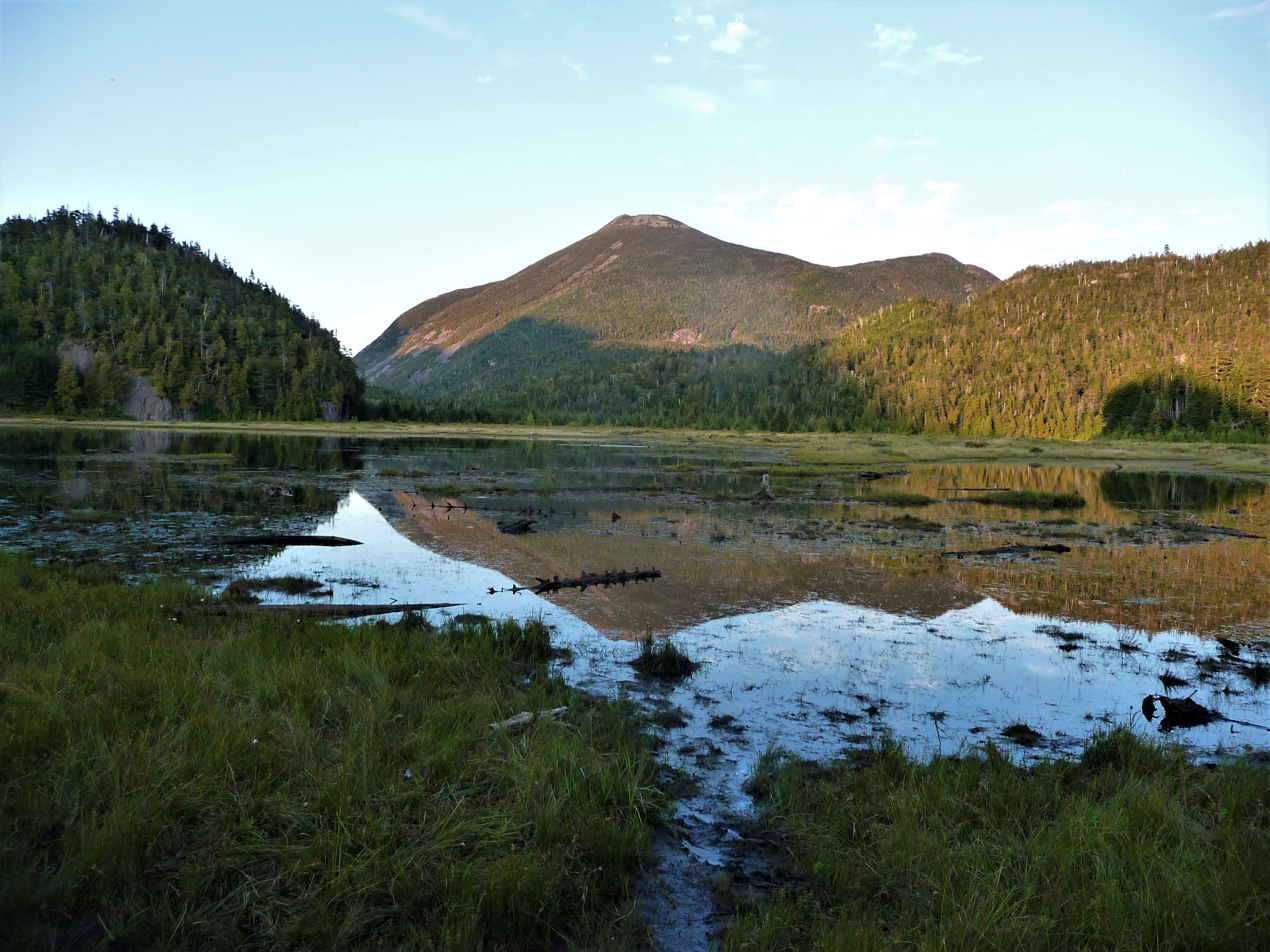
- Flowed Lands in 2017

- Location within New York Location within the United States
- Location: Essex County, New York, United States
- Coordinates: 44°06′46″N 73°59′29″W
- Primary inflows: Opalescent River
- Primary outflows: Opalescent River, Calamity Brook
- Basin countries: United States
- Surface area: 19 acres (7.7 ha)
- Surface elevation: 2,753 ft (839 m)
- Islands: none

Flowed Lands is a 19-acre (7.7 ha) lake located in the Adirondack High Peaks in Essex County, New York.
