= Lake Tear of the Clouds =

Lake in New York, USA

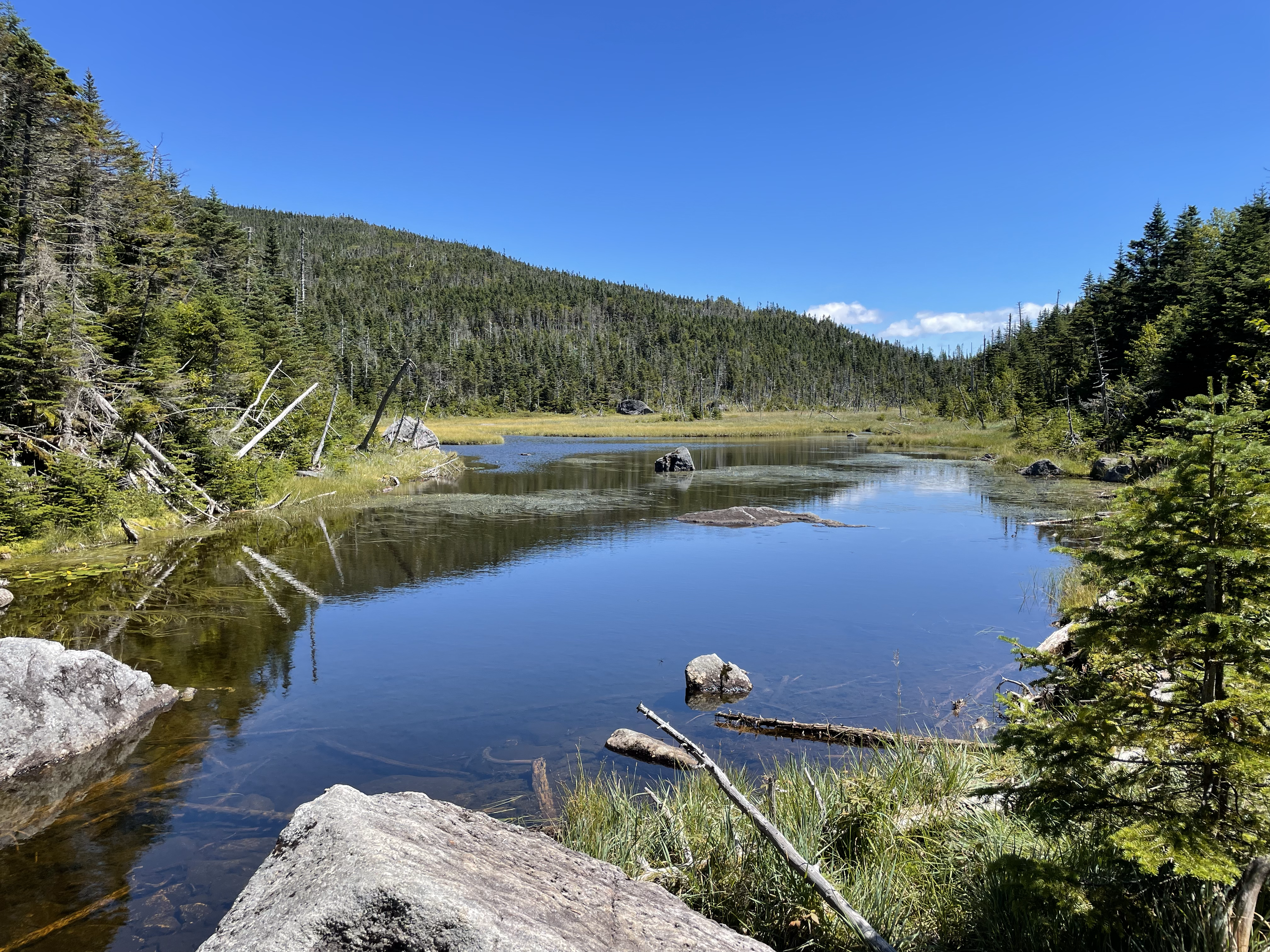
- Lake Tear of the Clouds in summer

- Location within New York Location within the United States
- Location: Essex County, New York
- Coordinates: 44°06′24″N 73°56′09″W
- Type: tarn
- Primary inflows: unnamed streams
- Primary outflows: Feldspar Brook
- Basin countries: United States
- Surface elevation: 4,293 ft (1,309 m)

Lake Tear of the Clouds is a small tarn located in the town of Keene, in Essex County, New York, United States, on the southwest slope of Mount Marcy, the state's highest point, in the Adirondack Mountains. It is the highest pond in the state at 4,293 feet (1,309 m). It is often cited as the highest source of the Hudson River, via Feldspar Brook, the Opalescent River and Calamity Brook.

The Hudson River as named actually begins several miles southwest at the outlet of Henderson Lake in Newcomb, New York.

In 1872 Verplanck Colvin described the lake as part of a survey of the Adirondack Mountains. He wrote:

Far above the chilly waters of Lake Avalanche at an elevation of 4,293 feet lies summit water, a minute, unpretending, tear of the clouds — as it were — a lovely pool shivering in the breezes of the mountains and sending its limpid surplus through Feldspar Brook to the Opalescent River, the well-spring of the Hudson.

On September 14, 1901, then-US Vice President Theodore Roosevelt was at Lake Tear of the Clouds after returning from a hike to the Mount Marcy summit when he received a message informing him that President William McKinley, who had been shot two weeks earlier but was expected to survive, had taken a turn for the worse. Roosevelt hiked down the mountain back to the Upper Tahawus Club, Tahawus, New York, where he had been staying. He then took a 40-mile (64 km) midnight stage coach ride through the Adirondacks to the Adirondack Railway station at North Creek, New York, where he discovered that McKinley had died. Roosevelt took the train to Buffalo, New York, where he was officially sworn in as President. The route is now designated the Roosevelt-Marcy Trail.

In August 2016, scientists from Riverkeeper, CUNY Queens College, and Columbia University's Lamont–Doherty Earth Observatory gathered water samples at the lake to complete a first-of-its kind water quality test along the entire span of the 315-mile-long (507 km) Hudson River.
