= List of U.S. state and tribal wilderness areas =

List of wilderness areas designated by U.S. state and tribal governments. Seven states had designated wilderness programs in 2008 while some other states had designated wildernesses. In 2008, 12 states had 91 wilderness areas with a total protected area of around 3.2 million acres (12949.94 km^{2}). Florida had 10 wilderness areas until their authorizing legislation was repealed in 1989.

For federally designated wildernesses, see List of U.S. wilderness areas. There are also privately owned areas called wildernesses like the Nature Conservancy's 12,000 acre (49 km^{2}) Disney Wilderness Preserve in Florida.

== State wildernesses ==
=== Alaska ===
5 areas in 2007, total area 1,133,400 acres (4587 km^{2})

=== California ===
11 areas in 2007, total area 475,725 acres (1925 km^{2})

- Boney Mountains State Wilderness Area
- Mount San Jacinto State Wilderness Area
- Henry W. Coe State Wilderness (unofficially called the Orestimba Wilderness)
- Santa Rosa Mountains State Wilderness Area
- Sinkyone Wilderness State Park
- West Waddell Creek State Wilderness Area

=== Hawaii ===
- Alakai Wilderness Preserve - 9,000 acres (36 km^{2})
- South Kona Wilderness Area, approximately 1,458 acres

=== Maine ===
2 areas in 2007, total area 204,733 acres

- Allagash Wilderness Waterway

=== Maryland ===
- Maryland Wildlands Preservation System 38 areas in 2025, total area 65,956 acres (266.91 km^{2})

Type 1 Wildlands:

- Big Savage Mountain - 2879 acres Savage River State Forest
- Bear Pen - 1517 acres Savage River SF
- Middle Fork - 2932 acres Savage River SF
- High Rock - 650 acres Savage River SF
- Maple Run - 5125 acres Green Ridge SF
- Cunningham Falls - 4397 acres Cunningham Falls State Park
- Savage Ravines - 2789 acres Savage River SF
- Dan’s Mountain - 4047 acres Dan’s Mountain WMA
- Upper White Rock - 300 acres Garrett SF
- Backbone Mountain - 1706 acres Potomac State Forest/Savage River SF
- Maple Lick Run - 600 acres Potomac SF
- Puzzley Run - 457 acres Savage River SF

Type 2 Wildlands:

- Deep Run - 1416 acres Green Ridge State Forest
- Potomac Bends - 2645 acres Green Ridge SF
- Rocky Gap - 943 acres Rocky Gap State Park
- Sideling Hill - 1555 acres Sideling Hill WMA
- Islands of the Potomac - 790 acres Islands of the Potomac WMA
- Black Marsh - 667 acres North Point State Park
- Gunpowder Falls - 792 acres Gunpowder Falls State Park
- Patuxent River - 1579 acres Patuxent River State Park
- Soldiers Delight - 1798 acres Soldiers Delight NEA
- Morgan Run 499 acres - Morgan Run NEA
- Panther Branch 735 acres - Gunpowder Falls SP
- Sweathouse Branch - 1073 acres Gunpowder Falls SP
- Mingo Branch/Bush Cabin Run - 1272 acres Gunpowder Falls SP
- Belt Woods - 610 acres Belt Woods NEA
- Calvert Cliffs - 1079 acres Calvert Cliffs State Park
- St. Mary's River - 1445 acres St. Mary's River State Park
- Mattawoman - 2993 acres Mattawoman NEA
- Idylwild - 570 acres Idylwild WMA
- Pocomoke River - 3029 acres Pocomoke River State Forest/State Park
- Cypress Swamp - 2090 acres Pocomoke SF
- Cedar Island - 2880 acres Cedar Island WMA
- South Savage - 2079 acres Savage River State Forest
- Janes Island - 3125 acres Janes Island State Park
- Parker’s Creek - 1756 acres Parker’s Creek WMA
- Zekiah Swamp - 443 acres Zekiah Swamp NEA
- Chapman - 694 acres Chapman State Park

=== Michigan ===
4 areas in 2007, total area 57,733 acres (234 km^{2})

=== Minnesota ===
- state land within the Boundary Waters Canoe Area Wilderness

=== Missouri ===
13 areas in 2025, total area 26,178 acres (106 km^{2}) Missouri Wild Area System

- Big Sugar Creek, Cuivre River State Park - 1,675 acres
- Bryant Creek Hills, Bryant Creek State Park - 1,186 acres
- Coonville Creek, St. Francois State Park - 2,256 acres
- East Fork, Johnson's Shut-Ins State Park - 1,110 acres
- Elk River Hills, Big Sugar Creek State Park - 1,168 acres
- Gans Creek, Rock Bridge Memorial State Park - 720 acres
- Goggins Mountain, Johnson's Shut-Ins State Park - 5,800 acres
- Indian Creek, Trail of Tears State Park - 1,300 acres
- Mudlick Mountain, Sam A. Baker State Park - 4,420 acres
- Northwoods, Cuivre River State Park - 1,113 acres
- Patterson Hollow, Lake of the Ozarks State Park - 1,275 acres

Roaring River Hills, Roaring River State Park - 2,075 acres

- Whispering Pine, Hawn State Park - 2,080 acres

=== New York ===
22 areas in 2007, total area 1,214,217 acres (4,914 km^{2})

Adirondack Park:

- Blue Ridge Wilderness Area - 45,736 acres (185.09 km^{2})
- Dix Mountain Wilderness Area - 45,208 acres (182.95 km^{2})
- Five Ponds Wilderness Area - 117,978 acres (447.440 km^{2})
- Giant Mountain Wilderness Area - 22,768 acres (92.139 km^{2})
- Ha-De-Ron-Dah Wilderness Area - 26,528 acres (107.36 km^{2})
- High Peaks Wilderness Area - 192,685 acres (779.769 km^{2}) (part of High Peaks Wilderness Complex - 226,435 acres (916.74 km^{2}))
- Hoffman Notch Wilderness Area - 36,231 acres (146.62 km^{2})
- Jay Mountain Wilderness Area - 7,100 acres (28.73 km^{2})
- McKenzie Mountain Wilderness Area - 37,616 acres (152.23 km^{2})
- Pepperbox Wilderness Area - 22,560 acres (91.300 km^{2})
- Pharaoh Lake Wilderness Area - 45,883 acres (185.68 km^{2})
- Pigeon Lake Wilderness Area - 50,100 acres (202.75 km^{2})
- Saint Regis Canoe Area - 18,231 acres (73.778 km^{2})
- Sentinel Range Wilderness Area - 23,252 acres (94.098 km^{2})
- Siamese Ponds Wilderness Area - 112,524 acres (455.368 km^{2})
- Silver Lake Wilderness Area - 105,270 acres (426.013 km^{2})
- West Canada Lake Wilderness Area - 156,695 acres (634.122 km^{2})
- William C. Whitney Wilderness Area - 20,500 acres (83 km^{2})

Catskill Park:

- Slide Mountain Wilderness Area 47,500 acres (190 km^{2})
- Big Indian-Beaverkill Wilderness Area 33,000 acres (132 km^{2})
- Indian Head Wilderness Area 16,800 acres (67.2 km^{2})
- West Kill Wilderness Area 19,250 acres (77 km^{2})

(A proposed revision to the Catskill State Land Master Plan would upgrade two other management units in the Catskills from wild forest to wilderness status and transfer some land currently considered wild forest to existing wilderness areas)

=== Ohio ===
1 area in 2025

- Shawnee Wilderness Area in Shawnee State Forest, approximately 8,000 acres

=== Oklahoma ===
1 area in 2025

- McCurtain County Wilderness Area, total area 14,087 acres

=== Pennsylvania ===
Wild area name	State forest	County	Area	Date founded	Remarks
Algerine Wild Area	Tiadaghton	Lycoming	4,177 acres (1,690 ha)		Traversed by the Black Forest Trail.
Asaph Wild Area	Tioga	Tioga	2,070 acres (838 ha)		
Burns Run Wild Area	Sproul	Clinton	2,408 acres (974 ha)		Traversed by the Chuck Keiper Trail.
Clear Shade Wild Area	Gallitzin	Somerset	2,791 acres (1,129 ha)		Traversed by the John P. Saylor Trail.
Hammersley Wild Area	Susquehannock	Clinton, Potter	30,253 acres (12,243 ha)	2004	Largest area without a road in Pennsylvania.
James C. Nelson Wild Area	Tuscarora	Juniata, Perry	5,345 acres (2,163 ha)		Forest last cut between 1902 and 1917.
Kettle Creek Wild Area	Loyalsock	Sullivan	2,600 acres (1,100 ha)		
Martin Hill Wild Area	Buchanan	Bedford	11,676 acres (4,725 ha)		
McIntyre Wild Area	Loyalsock	Lycoming	7,500 acres (3,035 ha)		Includes remnants of a ghost town.
Penns Creek Wild Area	Bald Eagle	Mifflin, Union	6,200 acres (2,509 ha)	2016	
Quebec Run Wild Area	Forbes	Fayette	7,441 acres (3,011 ha)	2004	
Quehanna Wild Area	Elk and Moshannon	Cameron, Clearfield, Elk	50,000 acres (20,234 ha)	1966	Largest Wild Area in Pennsylvania.
Russell P. Letterman Wild Area	Sproul	Clinton	4,715 acres (1,908 ha)		Traversed by the Chuck Keiper Trail.
Square Timber Wild Area	Elk	Cameron	8,461 acres (3,424 ha)		
Stairway Wild Area	Delaware	Pike	2,882 acres (1,166 ha)		
Thickhead Mountain Wild Area	Rothrock	Centre, Huntingdon	4,886 acres (1,977 ha)		
Trough Creek Wild Area	Rothrock	Huntingdon	1,703 acres (689 ha)		
Wolf Run Wild Area	Tiadaghton	Lycoming	6,900 acres (2,792 ha)		Traversed by the Golden Eagle Trail.

=== South Carolina ===
1 area in 2025

- Mountain Bridge Wilderness, approximately 17,000 acres

=== Tennessee ===
- Bridgestone/Firestone Centennial Wilderness - 10,000 acres (40 km^{2})

=== Wisconsin ===
1 area in 2002, total area 6,358 acres (2.6 km^{2} )

== Tribal wildernesses ==
=== Flathead Indian Reservation (Montana) ===
- Mission Mountains Tribal Wilderness

=== Great Lakes Indian Fish & Wildlife Commission ===
consisting of 11 Ojibwa tribes: Bay Mills Indian Community, Keweenaw Bay Indian Community and Lac Vieux Desert band in Michigan; Bad River, Lac Courte Oreilles, Lac du Flambeau, Sokaogon Chippewa Community, Red Cliff and St. Croix bands in Wisconsin; and Fond du Lac and Mille Lacs bands in Minnesota.

- in Chequamegon-Nicolet National Forest, Wisconsin
  - Blackjack Springs
  - Headwaters
  - Porcupine Lake
  - Rainbow
  - Whisker Lake
- in Ottawa National Forest, Michigan
  - McCormick
  - Sturgeon River Gorge
  - Sylvania
- in Hiawatha National Forest, Michigan
  - Big Island Lake
  - Delirium
  - Horseshoe Bay
  - Mackinac
  - Rock River Canyon
  - Round Island
- in Huron-Manistee National Forest, Michigan
  - Nordhouse Dunes
