= Tribal Areas =

Tribal Areas can refer to:

- Chittagong Hill Tracts in Bangladesh are considered as the tribal areas of Bangladesh
- Federally Administered Tribal Areas in Pakistan
- Provincially Administered Tribal Areas also in Pakistan
- Tripura Tribal Areas Autonomous District Council in India

== See also ==
- List of U.S. state and tribal wilderness areas
