= Jeffrey Gale =

American artisan

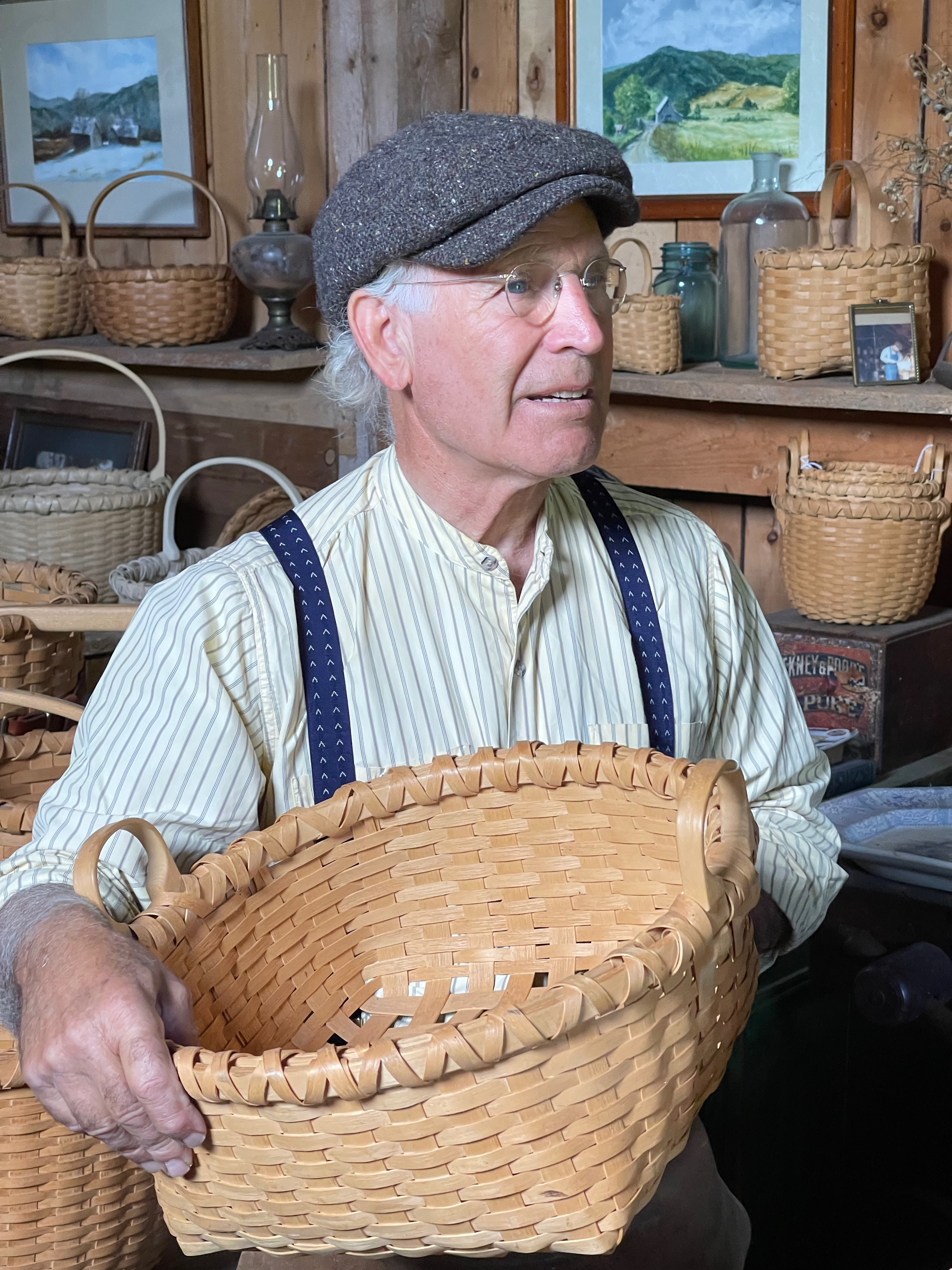
- Gale in 2024
- Born: April 14, 1952 (age 74); Huntington, New York
- Occupations: Basket maker, artist

Jeffrey Gale (born April 14, 1952 Huntington, New York) is an American craftsman, known for his white-ash basketry. His work is found in private collections and in the collection of the Smithsonian American Art Museum's Renwick Gallery. His craft derives both from research into past techniques and from his own innovations that build on tradition.

== Basketry ==
As of 2024, Gale maintained a workshop in Strafford, Vermont, where he harvested the wood for his craft from his own land. He typically harvested one or two ash trees, a year. He would pick trees that grow straight, owing to competition with others in the forest. Among contemporary basketmakers, he was the only one who worked with a tree that he had harvested, himself.

He made his baskets from white ash, which he split into "billets" (lengths of wood with a rectangular cross section), using a froe, a wedge, and a mallet. He then shaped the billets into "splints" (flat pieces of wood), trimmed to a desired thickness for weaving as a basket. He made the splints on a shaving horse, which allowed him to hold the billet in place as he shaped it to the desired size with a drawknife. After being separated from each other by striking the end of the billet with a mallet, the splints could be as thin as the thickness of the growth ring of the source tree. He steamed the splints to make them pliable. Gale used no power tools in the process.

Seven of his baskets are included in the Cole-Ware Collection of American Baskets at the Smithsonian American Art Museum's Renwick Gallery. They were displayed with 98 other baskets as part of the museum's "Measure of the Earth" exhibition of 63 contemporary basketmakers, who have revived traditional basket making. All the featured baskets were from natural materials harvested in nature by their makers.

== Influences ==
Gale apprenticed with an Adirondack pack basket maker, using oak, and started his business in 1982 as a basket maker. Two books by Eric Sloane, Sketches of America Past and A Reverence for Wood, inspired him to take up the craft. His contemporary white-ash basketry derives primarily from early New England techniques, but incorporates his own methods and designs.

== Gallery ==
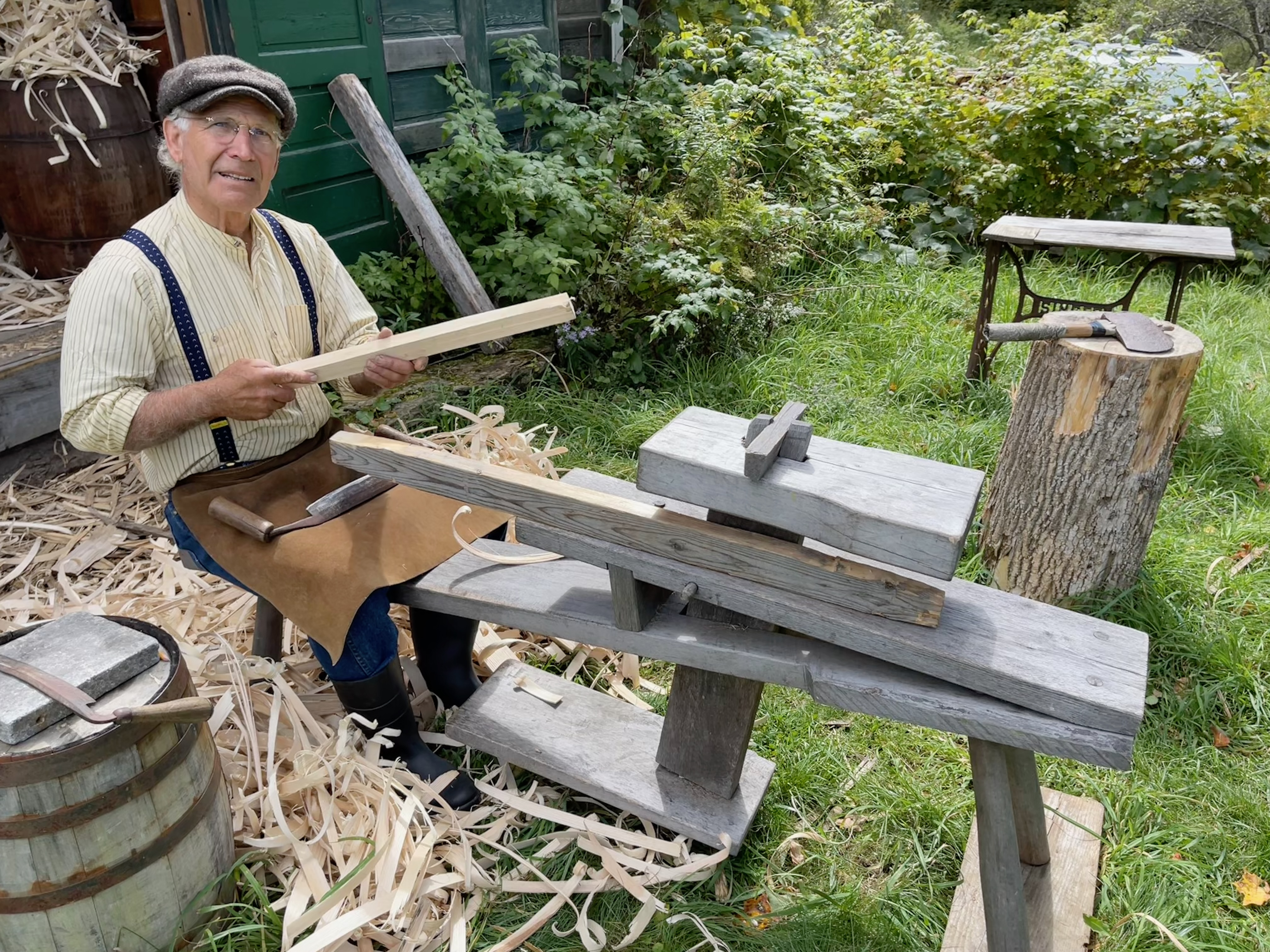
Gale placing a billet into his shaving horse to make splints

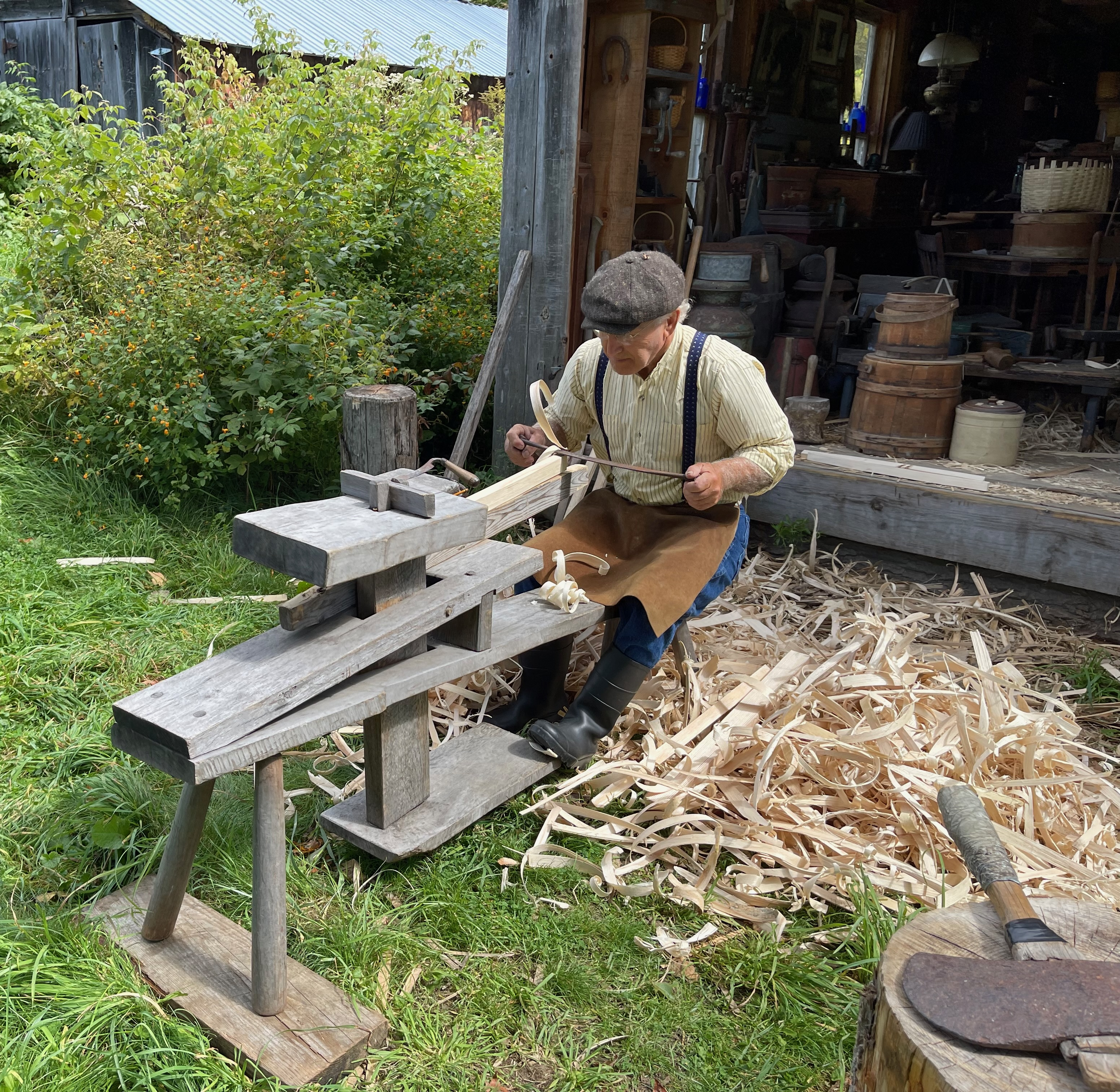
Using drawknife to shape the billet

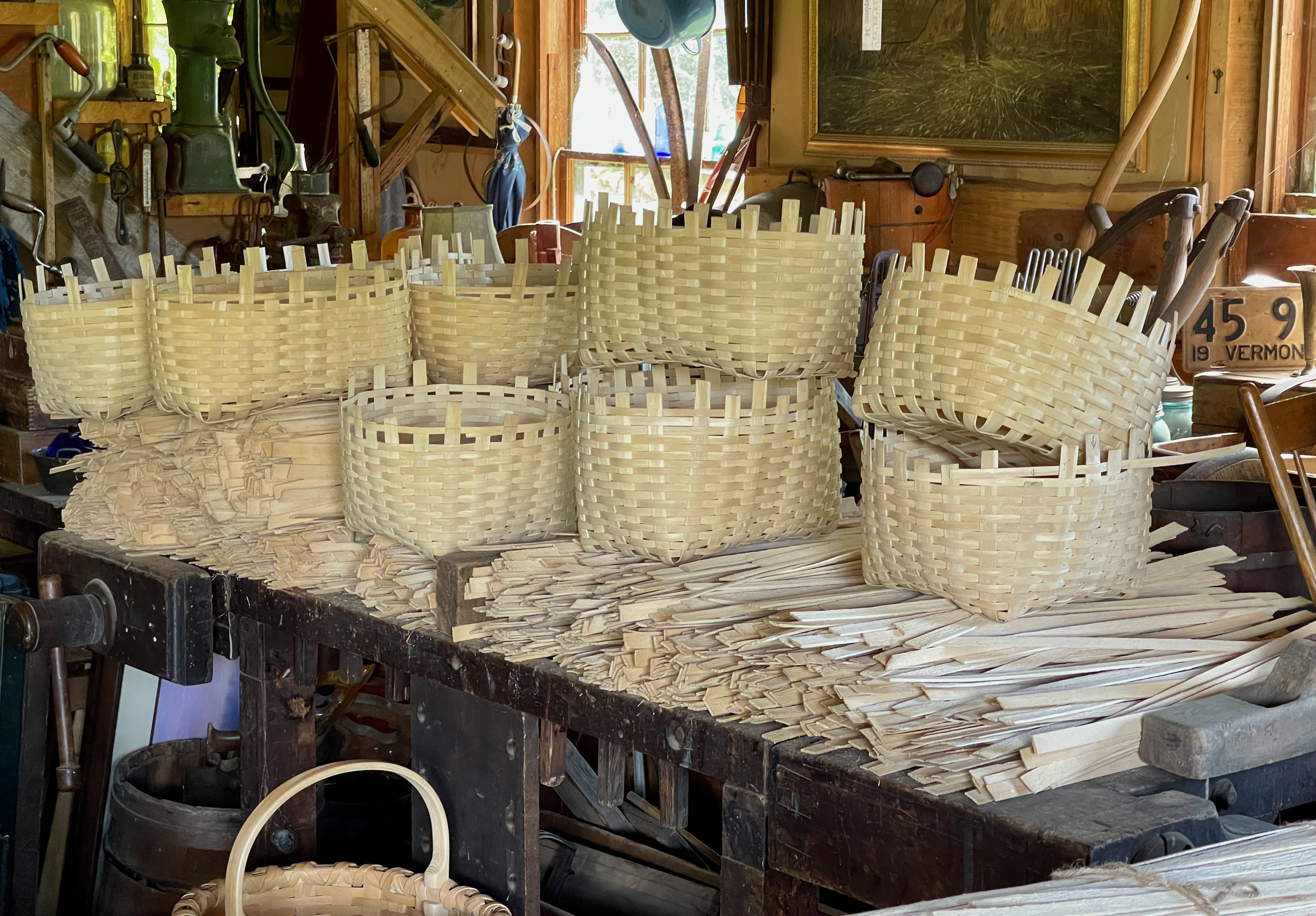
Unfinished baskets with splints

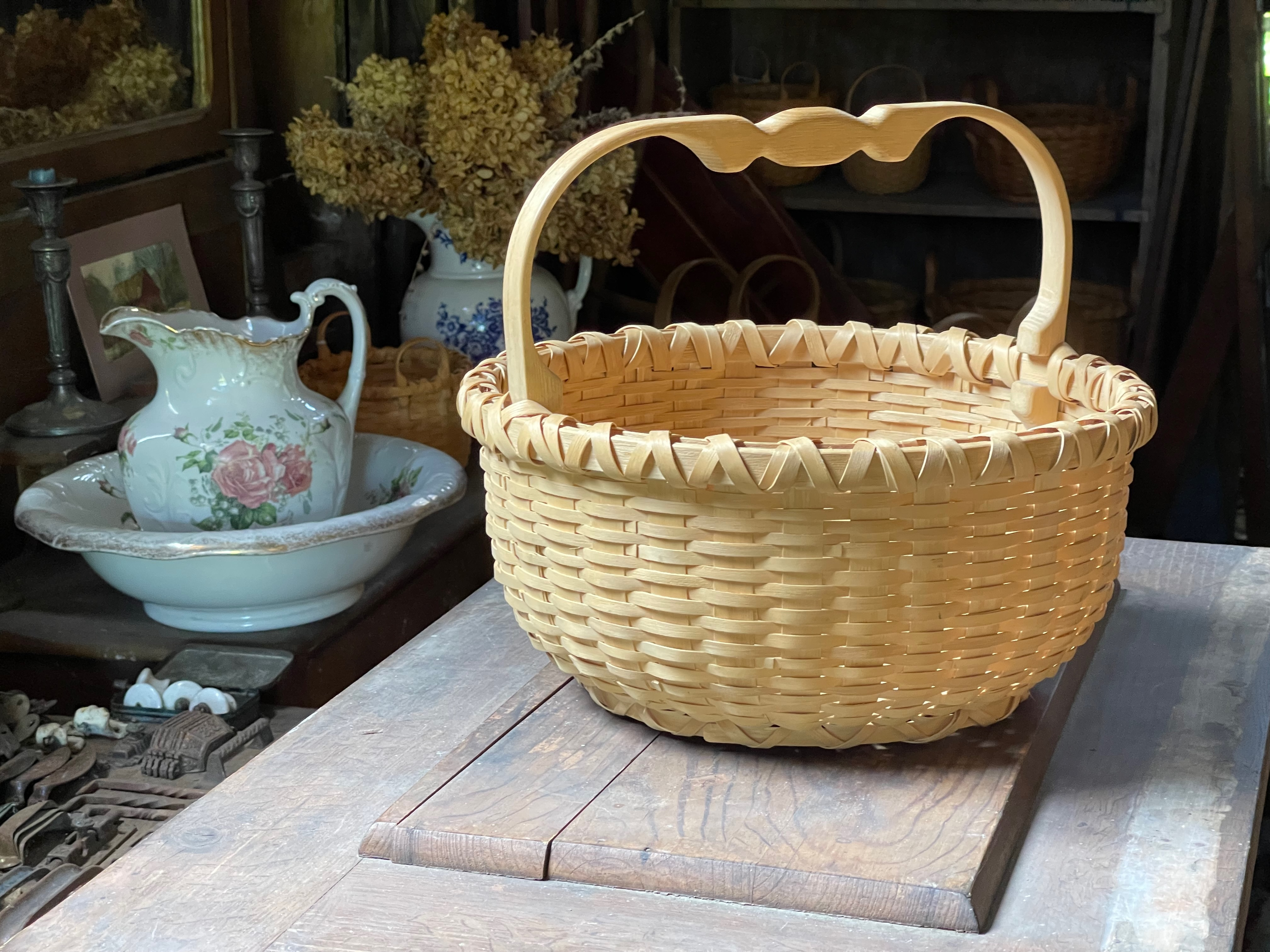
Finished basket with decorative handle

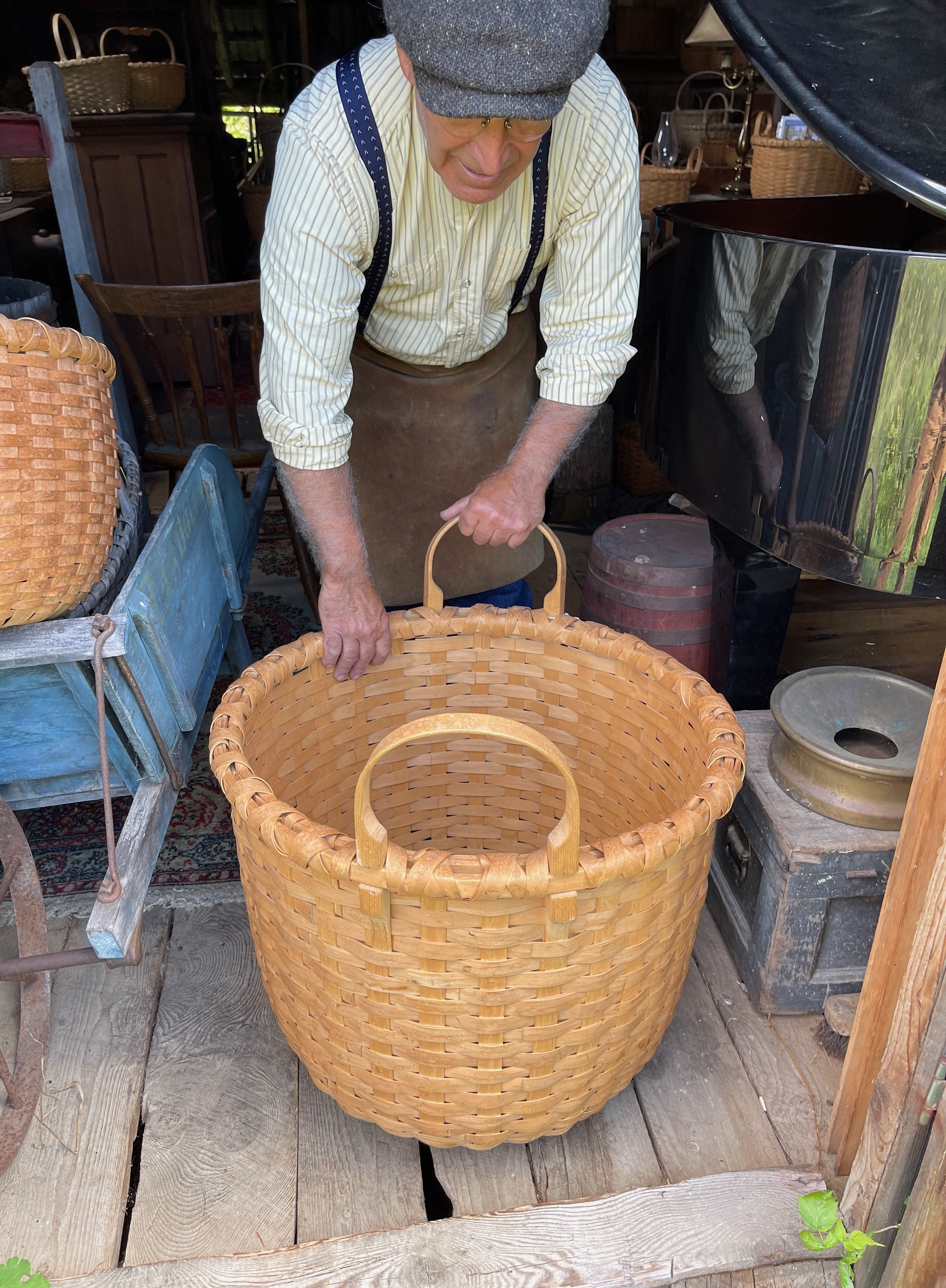
Gale with two-bushel basket

== See also ==
- Basket weaving
