= Adirondack Park =

Protected area in New York, U.S.

Coordinates: 44°00′N 74°20′W

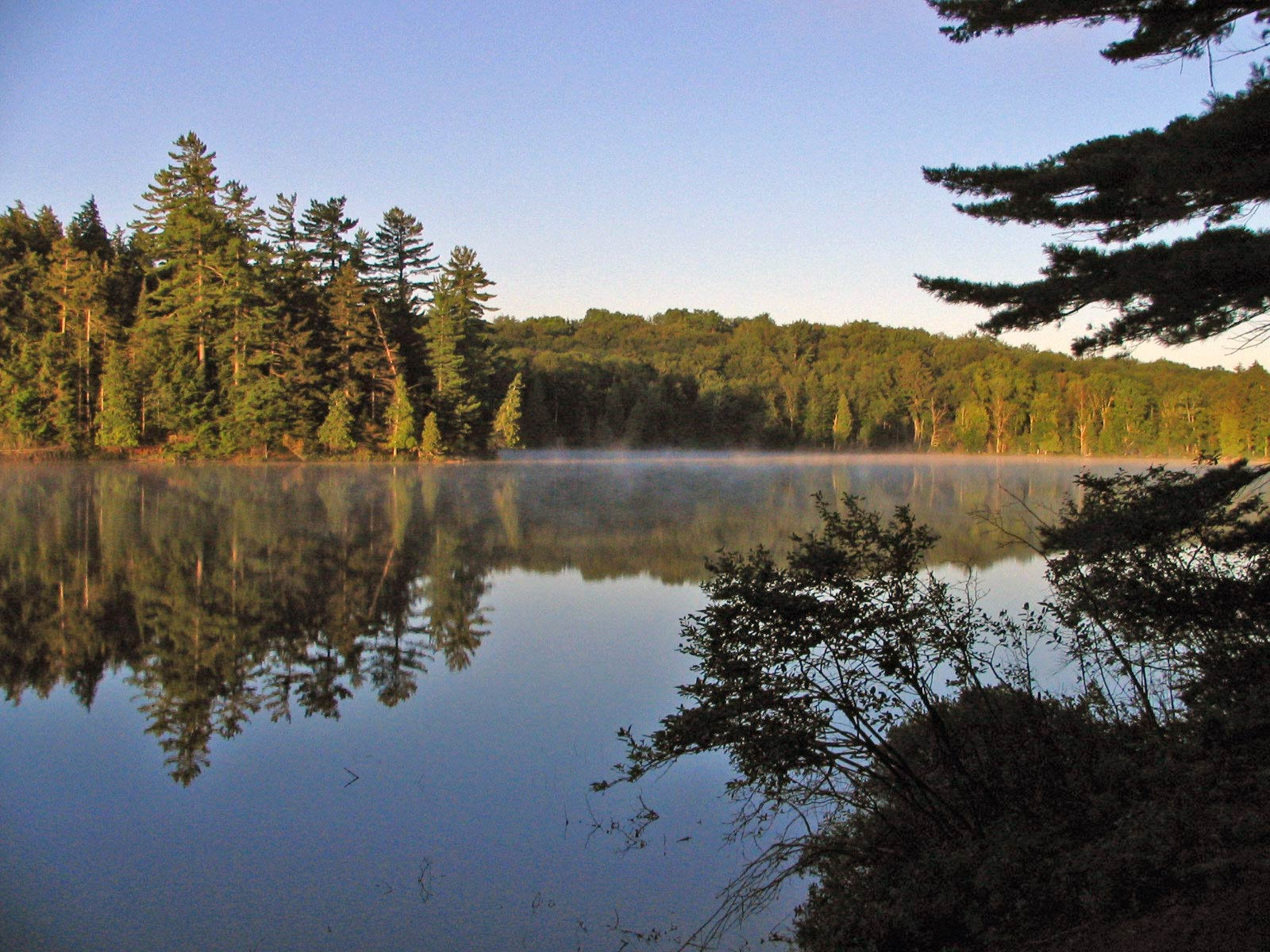
- Long Pond, in the Saint Regis Canoe Area

- Park area highlighted in green, bounded by the Blue Line, within New York state
- Location: New York, United States
- Area: 9,375 sq mi (24,280 km^{2})
- Established: New York State Forest Preserve
- Named for: Mohawk for bark eaters.
- Operator: Adirondack Park Agency, New York State Department of Environmental Conservation
- Adirondack Forest Preserve
- U.S. National Register of Historic Places
- U.S. National Historic Landmark
- Area: 2,000,000 acres (8,100 km^{2})
- NRHP reference No.: 66000891

Significant dates
- Added to NRHP: October 15, 1966
- Designated NHL: May 23, 1963

The Adirondack Park is the designation for a large area of northeastern New York centered on the Adirondack Mountains. Like Catskill Park to the south, the area is unusual in the United States because, while the entire area is considered "parkland", about 52 percent of the land within the boundary consists of privately owned inholdings. The remaining 48 percent is publicly owned by the state as part of the Forest Preserve. Use of public and private lands in the park is regulated by the Adirondack Park Agency.

The park was established in 1892 for "the free use of all the people for their health and pleasure", and for watershed protection. At 6.1 million acres (25,000 km^{2}), it is the largest park in the contiguous United States.

The Adirondack Park contains the 46 High Peaks, 2,800 lakes and ponds, 30,000 miles (48,000 km) of rivers and streams, and an estimated 200,000 acres (81,000 ha) of old-growth forests. It is home to 105 towns and villages, as well as numerous farms, businesses, and a timber-harvesting industry. The park has a population of 130,000 permanent and 200,000 seasonal residents, and sees over 12.4 million annual visitors. The inclusion of human communities has been described as one of the most successful experiments in conserving previously developed lands in the industrialized world.

The Adirondack Forest Preserve was designated a National Historic Landmark in 1963.

== History ==
=== Early tourism ===
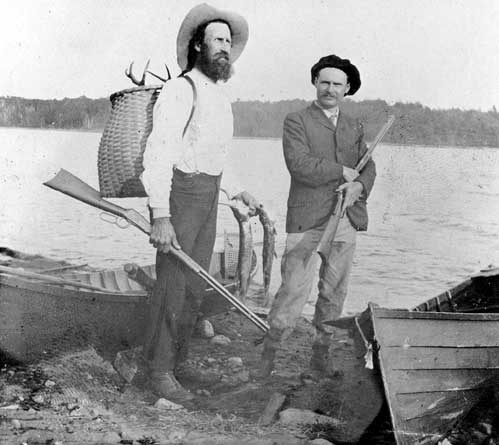
A guide (left), his sport, and his Adirondack guideboat and pack basket

Before the 19th century, the wilderness was viewed as desolate and forbidding. As Romanticism developed in the United States, the view of wilderness became more positive, as seen in the writings of James Fenimore Cooper, Ralph Waldo Emerson, John Muir, and Henry David Thoreau.

The 1849 publication of Joel Tyler Headley's Adirondack; or, Life in the Woods triggered the development of hotels and stage coach lines. William Henry Harrison Murray's 1869 wilderness guidebook depicted the area as a place of relaxation and pleasure rather than a natural obstacle.

Financier and railroad promoter Thomas Clark Durant acquired a large tract of central Adirondack land and built a railroad from Saratoga Springs to North Creek. By 1875, there were more than two hundred hotels in the Adirondacks including Paul Smith's Hotel. About this time, the Great Camps were developed.

=== Moves to protect New York's water supply ===
Following the Civil War, Reconstruction Era economic expansion led to an increase in logging and deforestation, especially in the southern Adirondacks.

In 1870 Verplanck Colvin made the first recorded ascent of Seward Mountain during which he saw the extensive damage done by lumbermen. He wrote a report which was read at the Albany Institute and printed by the New York State Museum of Natural History. In 1872 he was named to the newly created post of Superintendent of the Adirondack Survey and given a $1000 budget by the state legislature to institute a survey of the Adirondacks.

In 1873 he wrote a report arguing that if the Adirondack watershed was allowed to deteriorate, it would threaten the viability of the Erie Canal, which was then vital to New York's economy. He was subsequently appointed superintendent of the New York state land survey. In 1873, he recommended the creation of a state forest preserve covering the entire Adirondack region.

=== Article XIV: forever wild ===
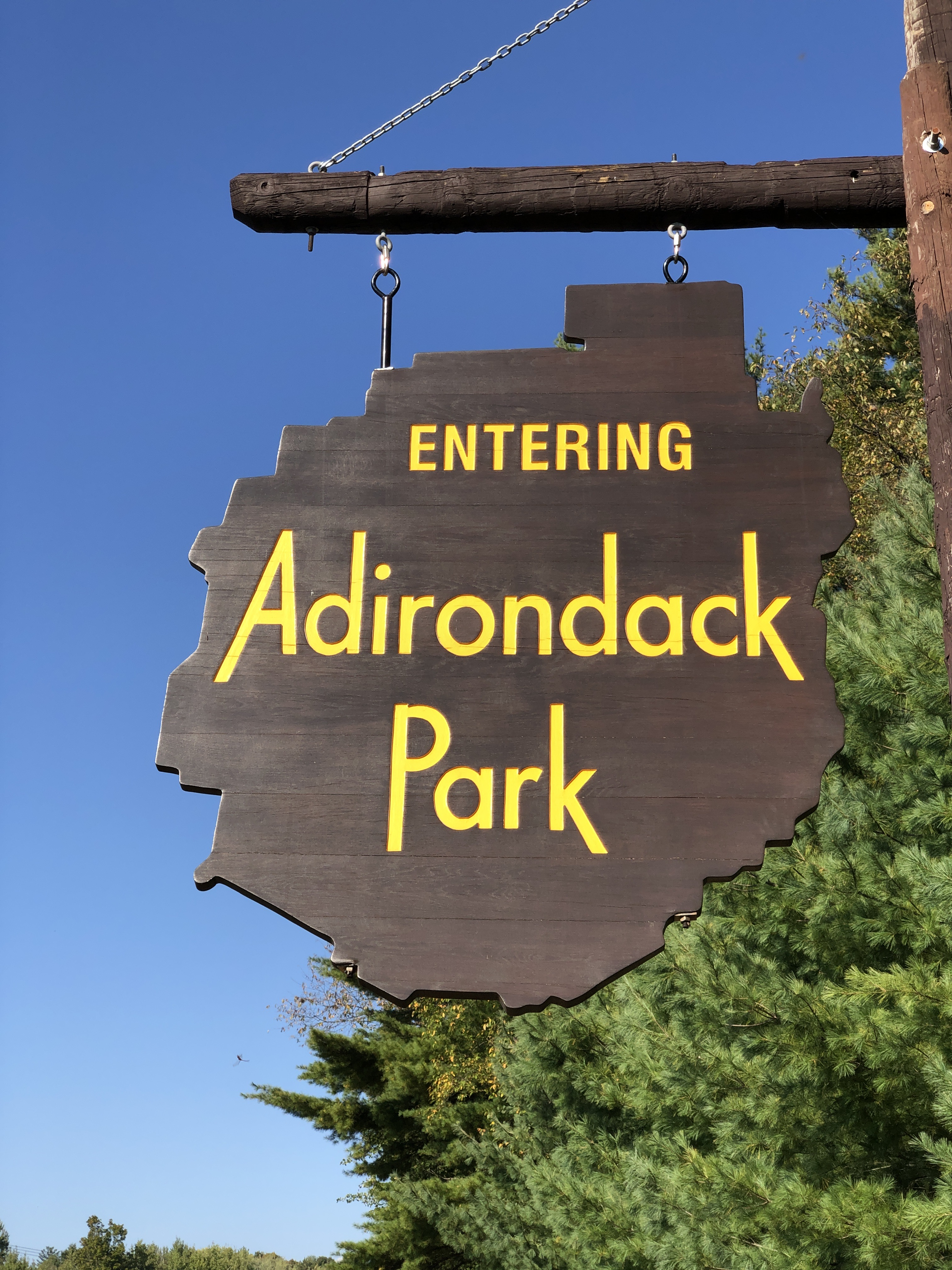
Sign in Mayfield, New York along northbound NY 30 entering Adirondack Park

In 1884, a state legislative commission chaired by botanist Charles Sprague Sargent recommended establishment of a forest preserve, to be "forever kept as wild forest lands." The New York State Legislature subsequently passed a law in 1885 for the preservation of forests which designated all state lands within certain counties in the Adirondacks and Catskills as Forest Preserve to be forever kept as wild forest lands. This forestry law also established a Forest Commission which was charged with care, custody, control and superintendence of the Forest Preserve.

In 1894, Article VII, Section 7, (renumbered in 1938 as Article XIV, Section 1) of the New York State Constitution was adopted, which reads in part:

The lands of the state, now owned or hereafter acquired, constituting the forest preserve as now fixed by law, shall be forever kept as wild forest lands. They shall not be leased, sold or exchanged, or be taken by any corporation, public or private, nor shall the timber thereon be sold, removed or destroyed.

In 1902, the legislature passed a bill defining the Adirondack Park for the first time in terms of the counties and towns within it. In 1912 the legislature further clarified that the park included the privately owned lands within it as well as the public holdings.

The restrictions on development and lumbering embodied in Article XIV have withstood many challenges from timber interests, hydropower projects and large-scale tourism development interests. Further, the language of the article, and decades of legal experience in its defense, are widely recognized as having laid the foundation for the U.S. National Wilderness Act of 1964. As a result of the legal protections, many pieces of the original forest of the Adirondacks have never been logged and are old-growth forest.

=== 20th-century development ===
In the early 20th century, recreational use increased dramatically. The State Conservation Department (now the Department of Environmental Conservation) responded by building more facilities: boat docks, tent platforms, lean-tos, and telephone and electrical lines. With the building of Interstate 87 in the 1960s, private lands came under great pressure for development. This growing crisis led to the 1971 creation of the Adirondack Park Agency (APA) to develop long-range land-use plans for both the public and private lands within the Blue Line.

In consultation with the DEC, the APA formulated the State Land Master Plan which was adopted into law in 1973. The plan is designed to channel much of the future growth in the Park around existing communities, where roads, utilities, services, and supplies already exist.

In 2008 The Nature Conservancy purchased Follensby Pond – about 14,600 acres (5,900 ha) of private land inside the park boundary – for $16 million. The group plans to sell the land to the state, which will add it to the forest preserve once the remaining leases for recreational hunting and fishing on the property expire.

=== Comparison of the Park in 1900 and 2000 ===
Year:	1900	2000
Area of the Park	2,800,000 acres (1,100,000 ha)	5,820,313 acres (2,355,397 ha)
State-owned area	1,200,000 acres (490,000 ha) (43%)	2,595,859 acres (1,050,507 ha) (44.6%)
Travel time, New York City to Old Forge	6.5 hours by railroad	5 hours by car
Permanent park residents	100,000	130,000
Length of public road in the park	4,154 miles (6,685 km) plus 500 miles (800 km) of passenger railroad track	6,970 miles (11,220 km) plus 50 miles (80 km) of passenger railroad track
Industry	92 sawmills, 15 iron mines, 10 pulp/paper mills	40 sawmills, 1 pulp/paper mill

Data compiled by the Adirondack Experience, Blue Mountain Lake, New York

== Park management ==
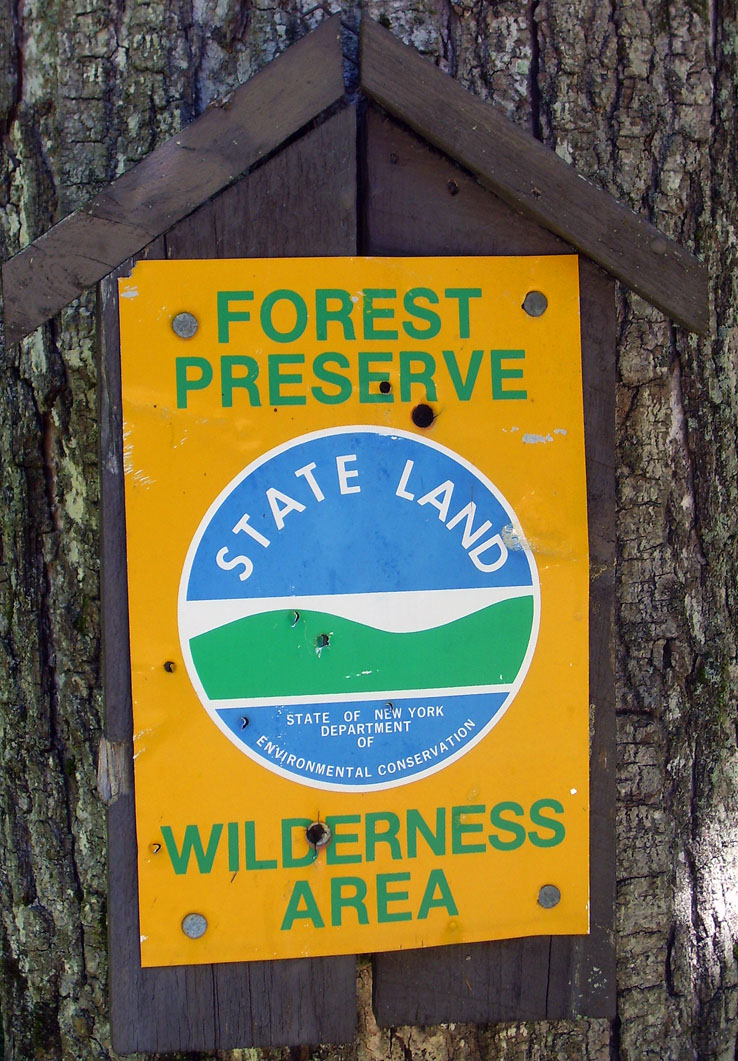
DEC sign marking state-land boundary

The park is managed by two state agencies: the New York State Department of Environmental Conservation, created in 1970 and headquartered in Albany; and the Adirondack Park Agency, created in 1971 and headquartered in Ray Brook. Noted forest ranger Clarence Petty sat on the commission that recommend the creation of the APA. This system of management is distinctly different from New York's state park system, which is managed by the Office of Parks, Recreation and Historic Preservation. According to the State Land Master Plan, state lands are classified.

The Adirondack Park Land Use and Development Plan (APLUDP) applies to private land use and development. It defines APA jurisdiction and is designed to direct and cluster development to minimize impact.

=== Land use classifications ===
Areas rounded to the nearest per cent. 49% of the park is privately owned, 45% state owned, and 6% is water.

==== Private land use ====
- Resource Management: 51% of private land use. Used for residential, agriculture, and forestry. Most development requires an Agency permit. Limited to an average of 15 buildings per square mile.
- Rural Use: 17%. Most uses are permitted; residential uses and reduced intensity development that preserves rural character is most suitable. Limited to an average of 75 buildings per square mile.
- Low Intensity: 9%. Most uses are permitted; residential development at a lower intensity than hamlet or moderate intensity is appropriate. Limited to an average of 200 buildings per square mile.
- Moderate Intensity: 3%. Most uses are permitted; residential development is most appropriate. Limited to an average of 500 buildings per square mile.
- Hamlet: 2%. These are the growth and service centers of the region where the APA encourages development with very limited permit requirements. Activities requiring an APA permit are: erecting buildings or structures over 40 feet high, projects involving more than 100 lots, sites or units, projects involving wetlands, airports, and watershed management projects. Hamlet boundaries usually go well beyond established settlements to provide room for future expansion. There is no limit on the average number of buildings per square mile.
- Industrial: <1%. Where industry exists or has existed, and areas which may be suitable for future development. Industrial and commercial uses are also allowed in other land use area classifications. There is no limit on the average number of buildings per square mile.

==== Adirondack Park state land use ====
- Wild forest: 51% of state land use. Areas that have seen higher human impact and can thus withstand a higher level of recreational use. Often these are lands which were logged heavily in the recent past (sometimes right before being transferred to the state). Powered vehicles are allowed.
- Wilderness: 46%. These are managed like federal U.S. Wilderness Areas. Areas far more affected by nature than humanity, to the extent that the latter is practically unnoticeable, for example virgin forest. No powered vehicles are allowed in wilderness areas. Recreation is limited to passive activities such as hiking, camping, hunting, birding and angling which are themselves subject to some further restrictions to ensure that they leave no trace.
- Canoe area: <1%. Lands with a wilderness character that have enough streams, lakes and ponds to provide ample opportunities for water-based recreation. The Saint Regis Canoe Area is the only such designated area in the park.
- Primitive: <1%. Like wilderness, but may have structures that cannot easily be removed, or some other existing use that would complicate a wilderness designation. For most practical purposes there is no difference between a primitive area and a wilderness area.
- Intensive Use: <1%. Places like state campgrounds or day use areas. The developed ski area Whiteface Mountain is in this classification.
- Historic: <1%. Sites of buildings owned by the state that are significant to the history, architecture, archaeology or culture of the Adirondacks, those on the National Register of Historic Places or carrying or recommended for a similar state-level designation.
- State Administrative: <1%. Applies to a limited number of DEC-owned lands that are managed for other than Forest Preserve purposes. It covers a number of facilities devoted to research, and state fish hatcheries.

==== Wilderness areas ====
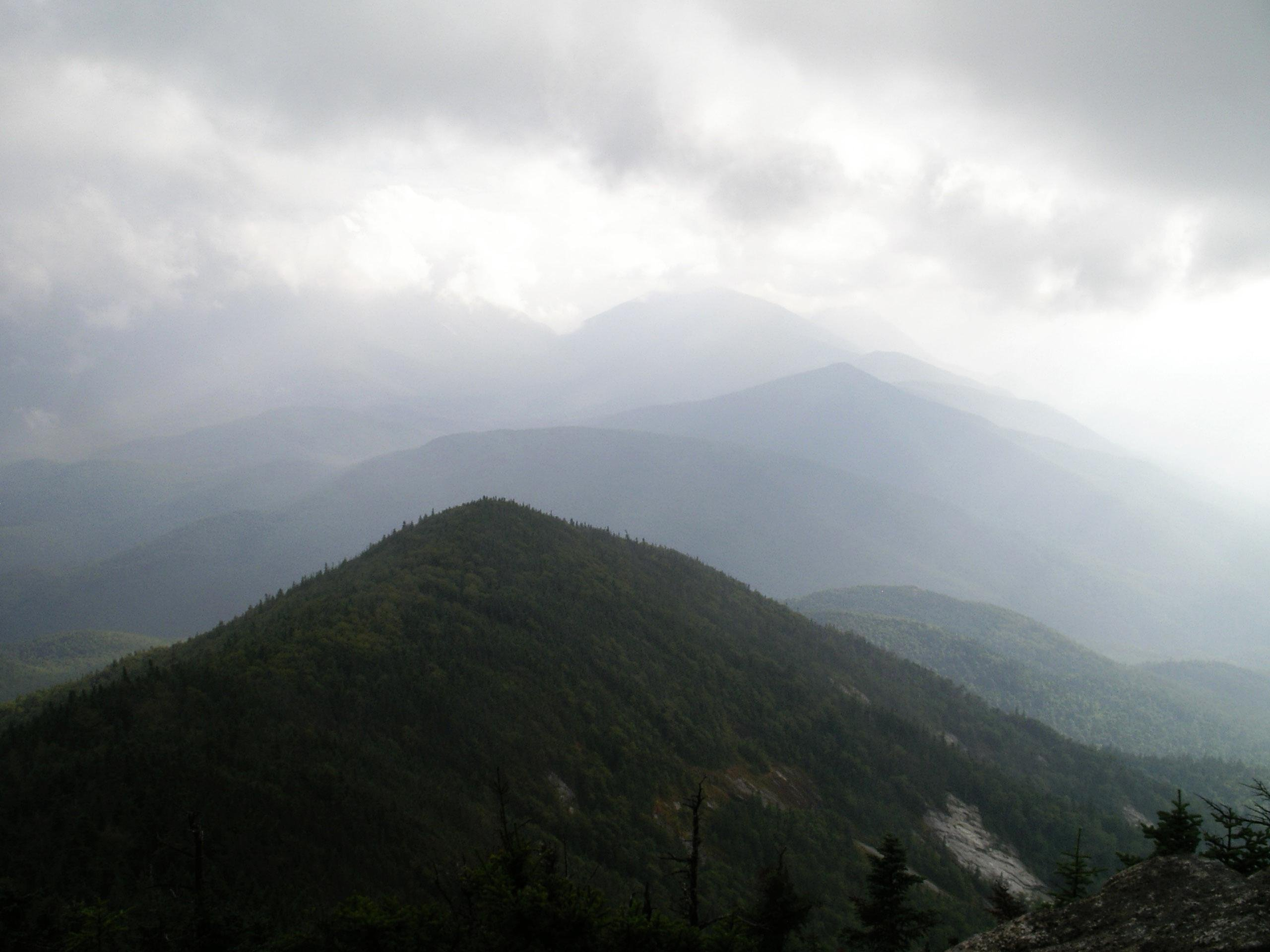
View of Dix Mountain Wilderness Area from the summit of Giant Mountain

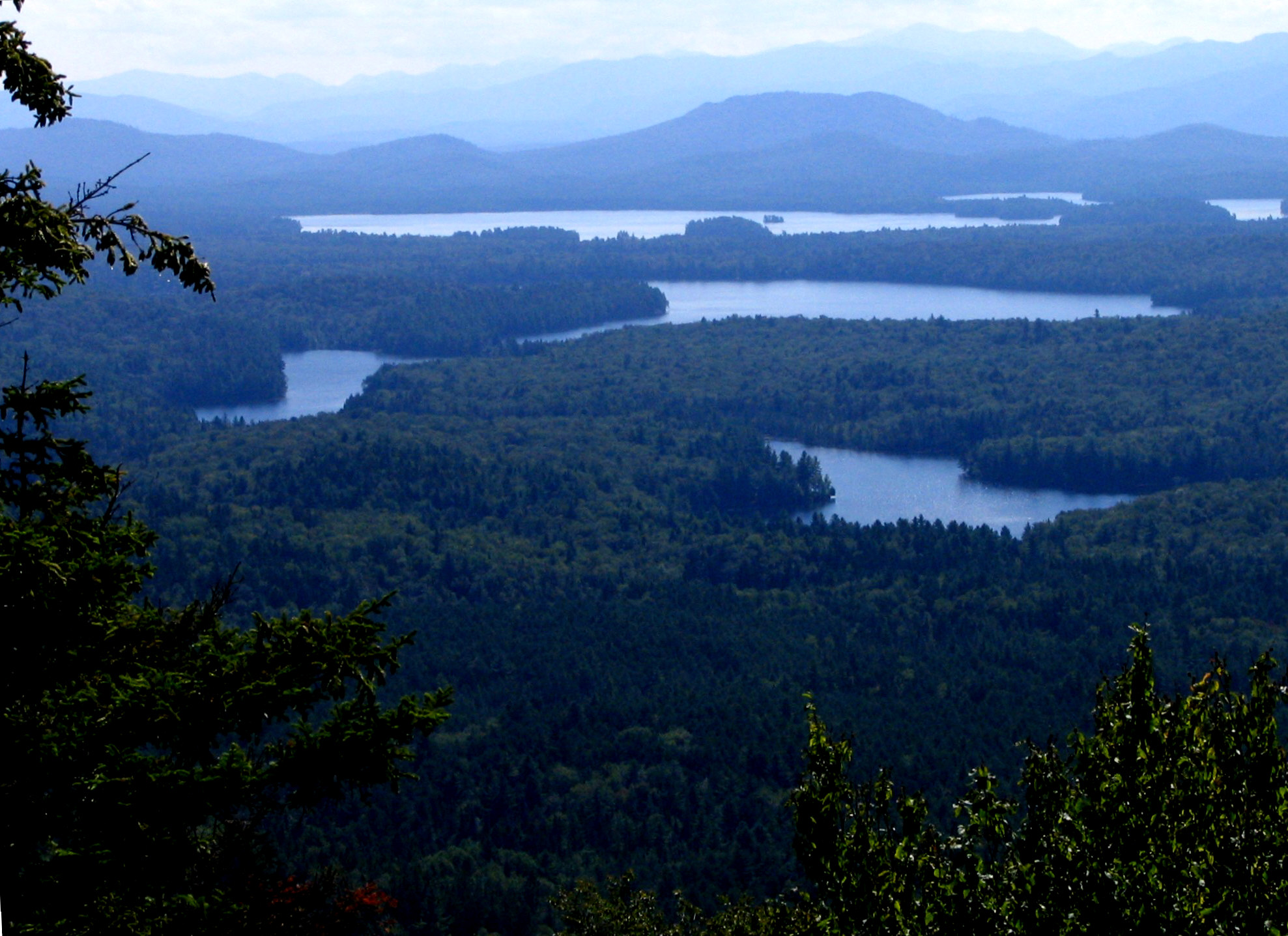
View from Long Pond Mountain of the St. Regis Canoe Area (High Peaks in the background)

State wilderness areas account for 46% of the area of the park which is not private property. They are managed like federal wilderness areas. These areas are far more affected by nature than humanity, to the extent that the latter is practically unnoticeable, for example virgin forest. No powered vehicles are allowed in wilderness areas.

- Blue Ridge Wilderness Area - 47,177 acres (185.09 km^{2}))
- Five Ponds Wilderness Area - 107,230 acres (447.44 km^{2})
- Giant Mountain Wilderness Area - 23,100 acres (92.14 km^{2})
- Ha-De-Ron-Dah Wilderness Area - 26,600 acres (107.36 km^{2})
- High Peaks Wilderness Area - 275,460 acres (779.77 km^{2})
- Hoffman Notch Wilderness Area - 38,488 acres (146.62 km^{2})
- Hudson Gorge Wilderness Area - 24,477 acres (99.05 km^{2})
- Hurricane Mountain Wilderness Area - 13,784 acres (55.78 km^{2})
- Jay Mountain Wilderness Area - 7,951 acres (28.7 km^{2})
- McKenzie Mountain Wilderness Area - 37,616 acres (152.23 km^{2})
- Pepperbox Wilderness Area - 23,816 acres (91.30 km^{2})
- Pharaoh Lake Wilderness Area - 46,283 acres (185.68 km^{2})
- Pigeon Lake Wilderness Area - 50,100 acres (202.8 km^{2})
- Round Lake Wilderness Area - 11,430 acres (44.5 km^{2})
- Sentinel Range Wilderness Area - 23,874 acres (94.10 km^{2})
- Siamese Ponds Wilderness Area - 114,010 acres (455.37 km^{2})
- Silver Lake Wilderness Area - 106,770 acres (426.01 km^{2})
- West Canada Lake Wilderness Area - 168,920 acres (634.12 km^{2})
- William C. Whitney Wilderness Area - 19,500 acres (83.0 km^{2})

The 19,000-acre (77 km^{2}) Saint Regis Canoe Area, presently the only Canoe Area in the park, operates under essentially the same conditions as the Wilderness Areas.

=== Advocacy ===
Private organizations are buying land in order to sell it back to New York State to be added to the public portion of the Park. A number of non-governmental organizations work for the park:

- The Adirondack Council, founded in 1975, is the largest citizen environmental group in New York State. Its mission is to ensure the ecological integrity and wild character of the Adirondack Park. It sponsors research, educates the public and policy makers, advocates for policies, and takes legal action when necessary to uphold constitutional protections and agency policies established to protect the Adirondacks.
- Adirondack Wild, whose goal is to uphold the "forever wild", or Article 14 of the New York Constitution.
- The Wildlife Conservation Society's Adirondack Program
- The Adirondack Chapter of the Nature Conservancy.
- The Adirondack Mountain Club has 28,000 members and has an environmental advocacy program that grew out of the need for responsible public policies to protect these lands.
- Founded in 1901, the Association for the Protection of the Adirondacks (AFPA) is the oldest non-profit advocate for the long-term protection and health of the natural and human communities of the Adirondack Park. In 2009, it merged with the Residents' Committee to Protect the Adirondacks (RCPA) and was renamed Protect the Adirondacks!
- The Adirondack Research Consortium (ARC) brings together scientists from research organizations and people who work to make the park a better place.

== Conservation ==
There are more than 3,000 lakes and 30,000 miles (48,000 km) of streams and rivers. Many areas within the park are devoid of settlements and distant from usable roads. The park includes over 2,000 miles (3,200 km) of hiking trails, which comprise the largest trail system in the nation

The fur trade led to the near-extirpation of the beaver in the park by 1893. Other species, such as the moose, elk, wolf, and cougar were hunted either for their meat, for sport, or because they were seen as a threat to livestock. The historical presence in the area of animals such as the Canada lynx, wolverine, and caribou are unclear.

Reintroduction efforts for beaver began around 1904 by introducing the remaining beaver in the Adirondacks to imported Canadian ones, and later, from Yellowstone. The population quickly grew to around 2000 in roughly ten years, and around 20,000 in 1921, with the addition of beavers in different areas of the park. Although the reintroduction was marked as an ecological success, the elevated beaver population was found to have negative economic impacts on waterways and timber sources.

The introduction of elk to the Adirondacks, a species that is unclear to have ever previously occupied the region, would continue after the late-19th century. After two previously failed attempts to introduce elk, in 1903, over 150 elk were reported by the State of New York Forest, Fish, and Game Commission to have been released and surviving in the park. The elk population increased for several years, only to decline and ultimately disappear due to poaching.

To protect and maintain the elk population in the future, the DeBar Mountain Game Refuge was established within the Forest Preserve. This act of preserving the species was motivated by hunting purposes rather than an ecological or natural aspect. The Game Refuge was defined by a wire fence, numerous postings, and caretakers employed by the State. This effort to control nature was also observed in the actions of the Civilian Conservation Corps (CCC), work crews who established access roads and water-supply expansion.

A negative result of the CCC coming to the Park was their trapping and killing of "vermin", which included animals such as hawks, owls, fox, and weasels that preyed on other species sought after by hunters and fishermen. This proved to have unanticipated ecological consequences (most notably the overpopulation of deer) which were reported by the New York State Conservation Department in 1945.

Ongoing efforts have been made to reintroduce native fauna that had been lost in the park during earlier exploitation. There are 53 known species of mammals that live in the park, including raccoons, moose, black bears, coyotes, opossums, beavers, porcupines, fishers, martens, river otters, and bobcats.

Notable birds of prey that breed in the park include the red-tailed hawk, broad-winged hawk, peregrine falcon, osprey, great horned owl, barred owl, northern saw-whet owl, and turkey vulture. Other notable breeding birds include northern forest specialists like Canada jays, black-backed woodpeckers, boreal chickadees, spruce grouse, palm warblers, and yellow-bellied flycatchers.

=== Amphibians and reptiles ===
The park is home to 39 species of amphibians and reptiles.

Frog species include the American bullfrog, American toad, gray treefrog, green frog (Lithobates clamitans), mink frog, northern leopard frog, pickerel frog, spring peeper, and wood frog. As of June 2025, it is not clear whether all frog populations are stable or will remain stable amid the global decline in amphibian populations. Some species, such as the green frog, pickerel frog, spring peeper, and wood frog, are considered stable or of low conservation concern in the Adirondack area. However, multiple species have experienced problems with breeding cycles. For example, wood frogs in Adirondack Park experienced die-offs caused by ranavirus in the late 2000s, following a broader trend of disease outbreaks among amphibians in the Northeastern United States. Scientists have expressed concerns that although the mink frog is not listed as an endangered species in the state of New York, the population living in Adirondack will likely experience local population decline, with Alvin Breisch (former herpetologist with the New York State Department of Environmental Conservation) stating that they may become locally extinct "in the next 75 years" due to warming summer temperatures (which Breisch attributes to climate change) disrupting their breeding cycle.

There are also several species of salamanders, including the Allegheny Mountain dusky salamander, blue-spotted salamander, eastern newt, eastern red-backed salamander, four-toed salamander, Jefferson salamander, common mudpuppy, northern dusky salamander (Desmognathus fuscus), northern two-lined salamander, spotted salamander, and spring salamander (Gyrinophilus porphyriticus).

There are 7 species of turtle: Blanding's turtle, the eastern musk turtle (Sternotherus odoratus), northern map turtle, painted turtle, common snapping turtle, spotted turtle, and wood turtle (Glyptemys insculpta). The spotted turtle and wood turtle are listed as species of special concern in the state of New York.

Other reptiles include the American five lined skink, common garter snake, the common ribbon snake (Thamnophis saurita saurita), DeKay's brown snake, eastern milk snake, Central ratsnake, eastern racer, northern watersnake, red-bellied snake, ring-necked snake, smooth green snake, and timber rattlesnake.

== Tourism and recreation ==
An estimated 7–10 million tourists visit the park annually. There are numerous accommodations, including cabins, hunting lodges, villas and hotels, in and around Lake Placid, Lake George, Saranac Lake, Old Forge, Schroon Lake and the St. Regis Lakes. Although the climate during the winter months can be severe, with temperatures falling below −30 °F (−34.4 °C), a number of sanatoriums were located there in the early twentieth century because of the positive effect the air had on tuberculosis patients.

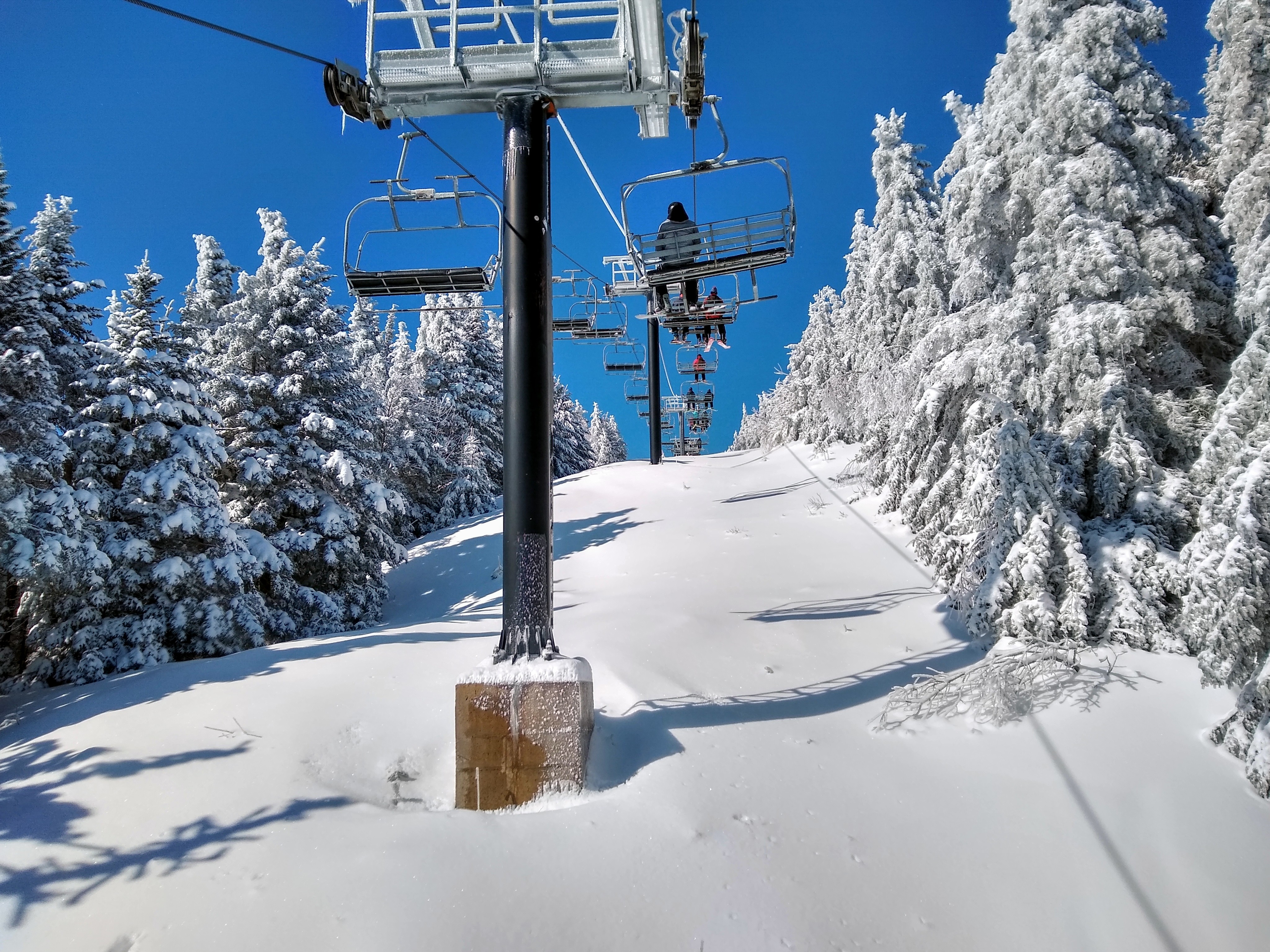
Chair Lift on Gore Mountain.

Golf courses within the park border include the Ausable Club, the Lake Placid Club, and the Ticonderoga Country Club. Many of the Adirondack Mountains, such as Whiteface Mountain (Wilmington), Mt. Pisgah (Saranac Lake), Gore Mountain (North Creek), West Mountain (Glens Falls), Hickory (Luzerne), and Mt. Morris (Tupper Lake) have been developed as ski areas.

Hunting and fishing are allowed in the Adirondack Park, although in many places there are strict regulations. Because of these regulations, the large tourist population has not overfished the area, and as such, the brooks, rivers, ponds and lakes are home to large trout and black bass populations. Although restricted from much of the park, snowmobile enthusiasts can ride on a large network of trails.

=== Cultural ===
The Adirondack Park Agency visitor interpretive centers are designed to help orient visitors to the park via educational programs, exhibits, and interpretive trails. Educational programs are available for school groups as well as the general public.

The Wild Center in Tupper Lake offers extensive exhibits about the natural history of the region, including a 1,000-foot-long series of elevated bridges that rise up over the forest on the center's campus. Many of the exhibits are live and include native turtles, otter, birds, fish and porcupines. The center, which is open year-round, has trails to a river and pond on its campus.

The Adirondack Experience in Blue Mountain Lake contains an extensive collection about the human settlement of the Park.

The Six Nation Indian Museum in Franklin has as a mission to provide education about Iroquois (also known as Haudenosaunee) culture, particularly environmental ethics, and to reinforce traditional values and philosophies. This is done via artifacts, presentations, and hosted visits.

=== Hiking and rock climbing ===
The 46 highest mountains in the park, known as Adirondack High Peaks, were thought to be over 4,000 feet (1,219 m) when climbed by brothers Robert and George Marshall between 1918 and 1924. Surveys have since shown that four of these peaks — Blake Peak, Cliff Mountain, Nye Mountain and Couchsachraga Peak — are in fact just slightly under 4,000 feet (1,219 m). Some hikers try to climb all of the original 46 peaks, and there is a Forty Sixers club for those who have done so.

Cliffs with rock climbing and ice climbing routes are scattered throughout the park boundaries.

=== Watersports ===
The surface of many of the lakes lies at an elevation above 1,500 ft (457 m); their shores are usually rocky and irregular, and the wild scenery within their vicinity has made them very attractive to tourists. It is the site of the Adirondack Canoe Classic. Flatwater and whitewater canoeing and kayaking are very popular. Hundreds of lakes, ponds, and slow-moving streams link to provide routes ranging from under one mile (1.6 km) to weeklong treks. Whitewater kayaking and canoeing are popular on many free-flowing rivers in the Adirondacks, particularly in the spring. Whitewater rafting trips are run in the spring on the Moose River near Old Forge. Raft trips are possible on the Hudson River near North River from April to October, due to dam releases provided by the Town of Indian Lake.

Motorboating is formally restricted on only a few bodies of water.

=== Visitor centers ===
The Adirondack Park Agency visitor interpretive centers (or VICs) were established in 1989 and 1990. The centers helped orient visitors to the park via educational programs, exhibits, and interpretive trails. Educational programs were available for school groups as well as the general public. Due to state fiscal and budgetary constraints, Governor David Paterson marked the VICs for closure on December 31, 2010, and in 2011, New York State sold both visitor centers to nearby colleges.

==== Paul Smith's College VIC ====
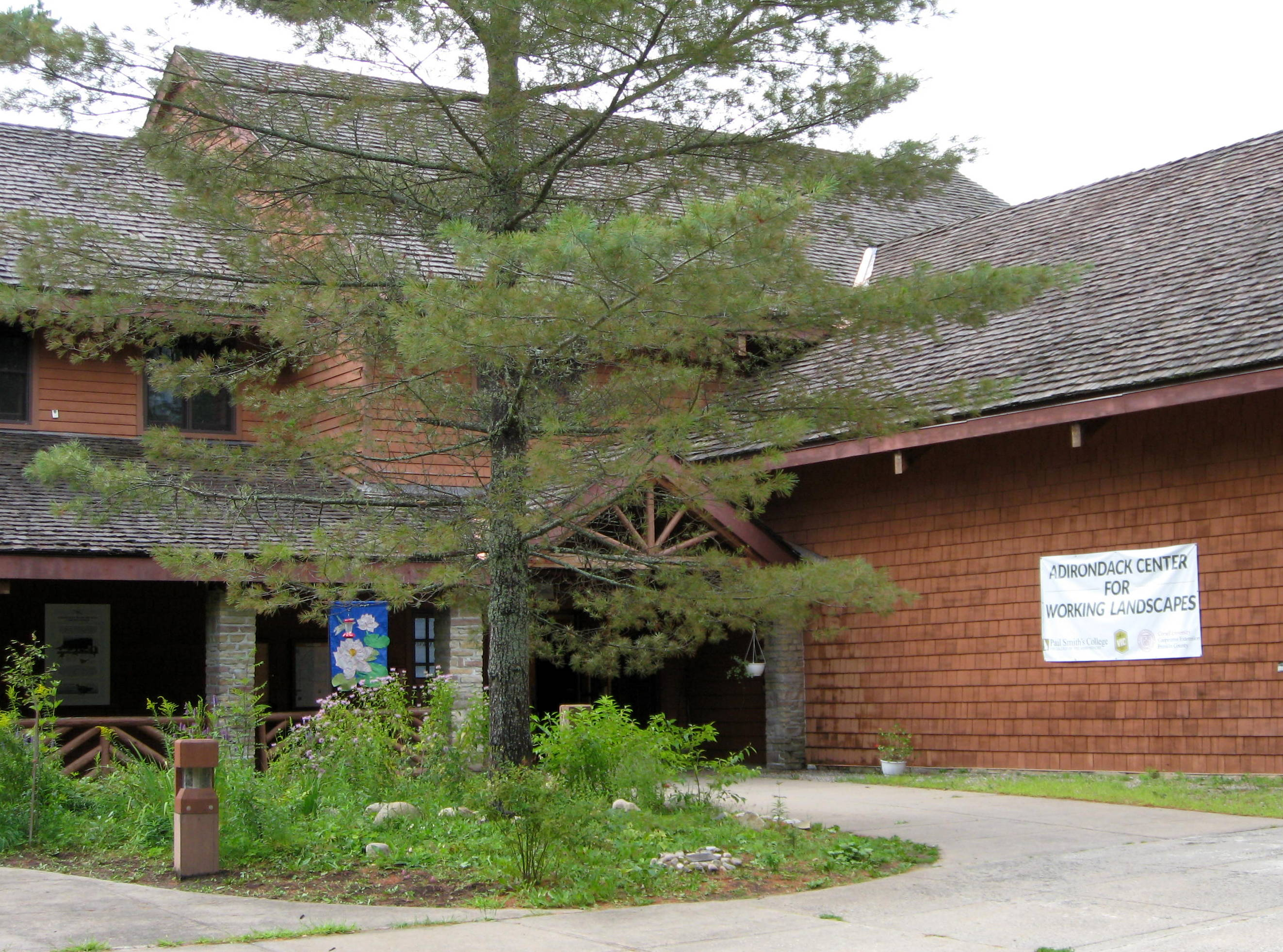
Paul Smith's College VIC

The Paul Smith's VIC opened in 1989 and in 2011 became the Paul Smith's College VIC, owned and operated by Paul Smith's College. Located on approximately 2,700 acres (11 km2) in Paul Smiths, New York, near Paul Smith's College, the Paul Smith's College Visitor Interpretive Center has approximately 25 miles of maintained trails. Throughout the property visitors will encounter every habitat type found in the Adirondack Park except alpine. Each spring the PSC VIC hosts the Great Adirondack Birding Festival. Throughout the year visitors can partake of guided interpretive walks, regular outdoor activities, naturalist-led canoe paddles on Barnum Pond, and assorted workshops and programs. In the winter the trails are open for snowshoeing and cross-country skiing.

==== Newcomb center ====
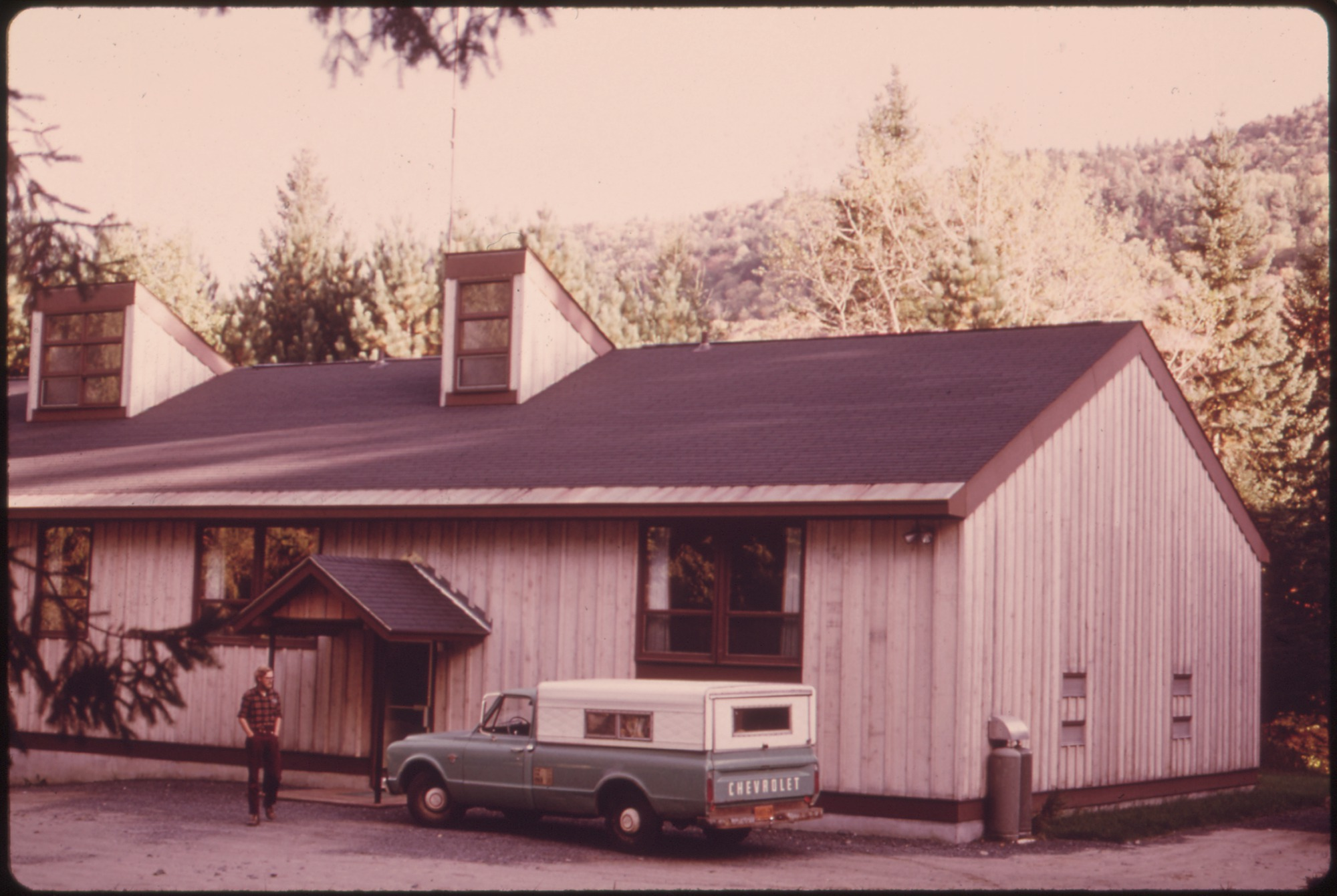
SUNY-ESF Adirondack Ecological Center, c. 1973

The Adirondack Interpretive Center is situated on ESF's Huntington Wildlife Forest, a 15,000-acre (61 km^{2}) biological field station the college has operated in Newcomb since 1932, and also home to the college's Adirondack Ecological Center. It opened in 1990. Located on 236 acres (0.96 km2) at the outlet of Rich Lake, the center has approximately three and a half miles of interpretive trails. Habitats include lakeshore, wetlands, old growth forest, and mixed northern forest. Throughout the year staff conduct naturalist-led trail walks, guided paddles on Rich Lake, and assorted workshops and lectures. All trails are open in the winter for snowshoeing; cross-country skiing is permitted, and requires varying degrees of skill depending on trails and conditions. Management and ownership of the Newcomb center was assumed by the SUNY College of Environmental Science and Forestry (SUNY-ESF) on July 1, 2010, with program responsibility beginning January 1, 2011.

== Development and industry ==
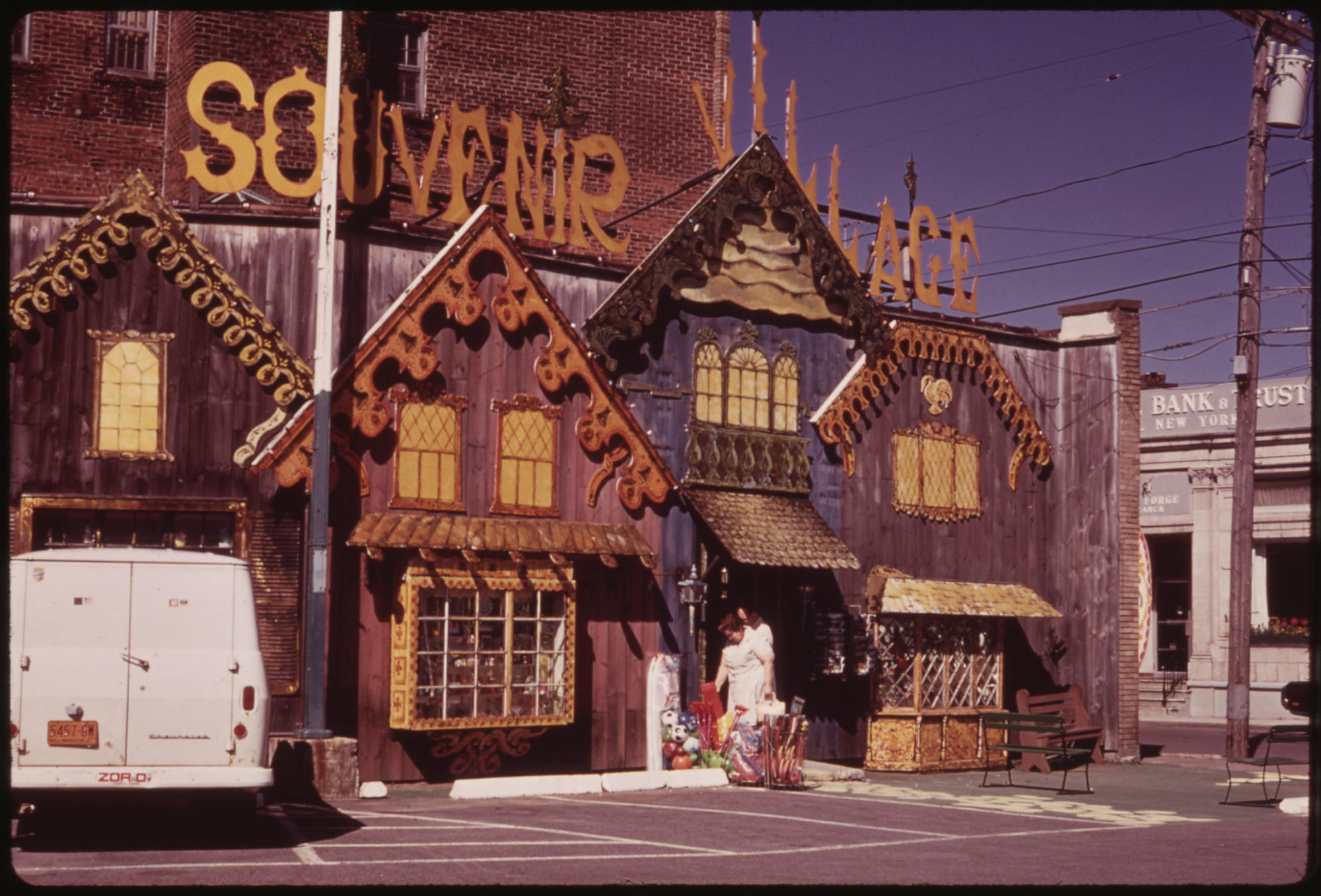
Tourism in Old Forge, 1973

While the park does contain large areas of wilderness, some areas developed to a varying degree.

Census towns with more than 5,000 inhabitants include:

- Tupper Lake
- Ticonderoga
- Dannemora, site of the Clinton Correctional Facility. Although most of the town, including the prison, is located inside the park boundary, the entire town is excluded from the park by statute.
- Harrietstown includes Saranac Lake and the Adirondack Regional Airport.
- North Elba includes Lake Placid, and the Lake Placid Olympic Sports Complex.

Interstate 87 or Northway, completed in the 1970s, runs north to south through the eastern edge of the park, connecting Montreal to Upstate New York. The park is traversed by military training routes of the Air National Guard.

There are six business parks in Essex County, of which two have certified shovel ready sites. There are also two in Franklin County. There are many maple syrup producers, and their work is documented at the American Maple Museum at Croghan.

Educational institutions include the State University of New York College of Environmental Science and Forestry and Paul Smith's College.

=== Railways ===
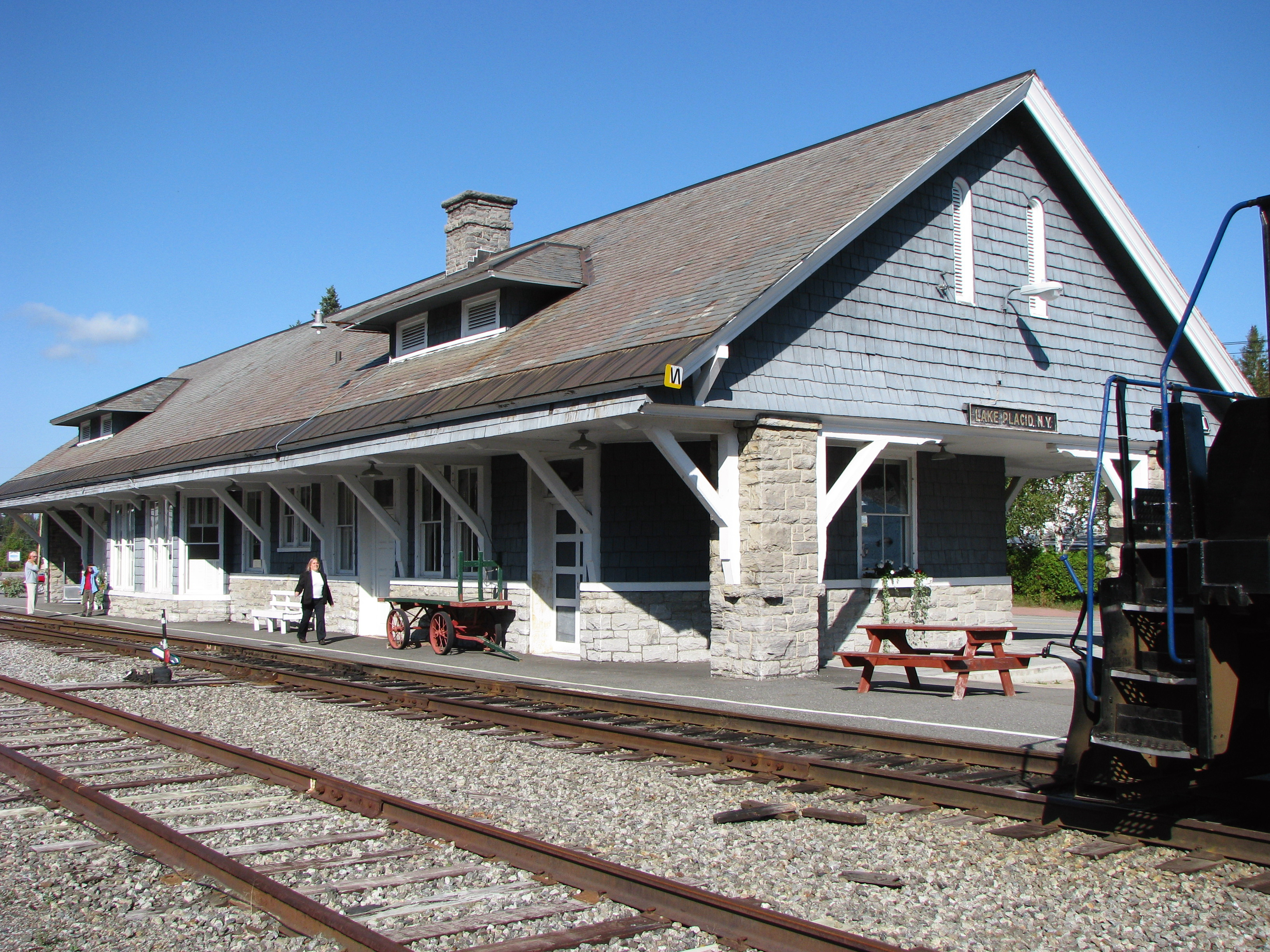
New York Central's Lake Placid station

Railways were used extensively from about 1871 to the 1930s for passenger transport and freight. Passenger transport was supplemented by stagecoaches. Rail operators included Chateaugay Railroad, Adirondack Railway, Delaware and Hudson Canal Company, Lake Champlain Transportation Company, New York Central Railroad, Northern Adirondack Railroad Company, Ogdensburg and Lake Champlain Railroad, New York and Ottawa Railway, Mohawk and Malone Railway and Fulton Chain Railway.

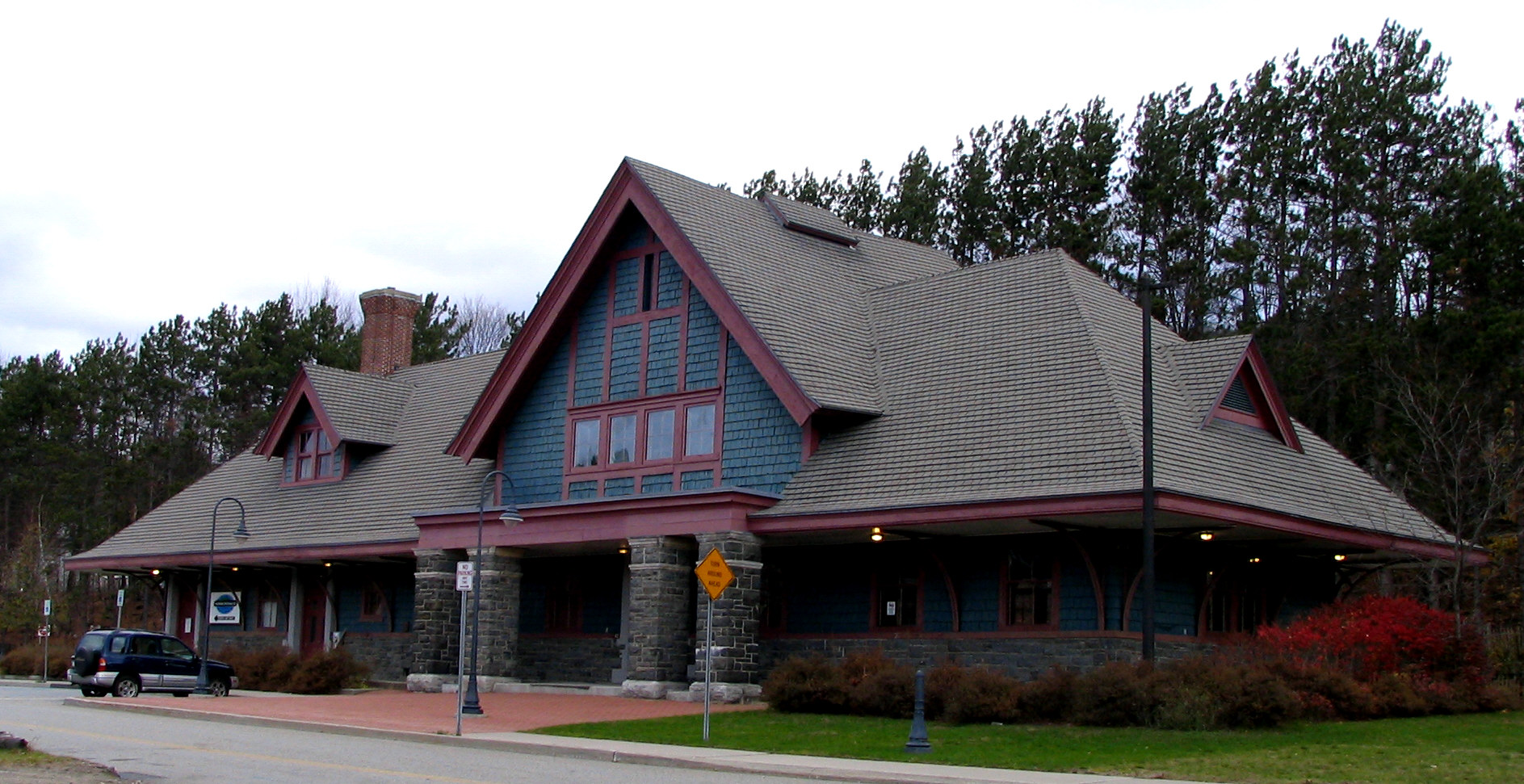
New York Central's Saranac Lake station

The principal rail company to the major resorts was the New York Central Railroad. Destinations within the park, served by its Adirondack Division, included Loon Lake, Saranac Lake, Lake Placid, Santa Clara, Tupper Lake, Thendara, Old Forge, and Lake Clear. On the edge of the park boundary were Brandon and St. Regis Falls. North of the park were Moira and Malone. In 1920 there were 10 scheduled daily passenger train stops in Big Moose.

Starting in the 1930s, people began to use automobiles rather than the train. However, through the 1950s and until 1961, there was a daily day train and a daily night train in each direction to Lake Placid station. Passenger train service ended on April 24, 1965. Freight service to and from the Adirondacks also declined after World War II. The Penn Central Transportation Company, successor to the New York Central, continued freight service between Utica and Lake Placid until it abandoned the Remsen-Lake Placid line in 1972.

In recent years several sections of these rail lines have been repurposed and used for Rail Biking allowing scenic tours along the historical tracks. These include lines out of the stations in North Creek Railroad Station Complex, Thurman, and Riparius, New York.

=== Airports ===
There are many small airstrips and lakes for seaplanes to land but there is only one commercial airport within the park. The Adirondack Regional Airport sits just outside of the Village of Saranac Lake in the hamlet of Lake Clear, town of Harrietstown. The airport's commercial airline service is funded by the government's Essential Air Service program, which provides small communities with flights to major cities that could not be supported without the help of government funding. Plattsburgh International Airport is located 10 miles (16 km) outside the park.

== Architectural heritage ==
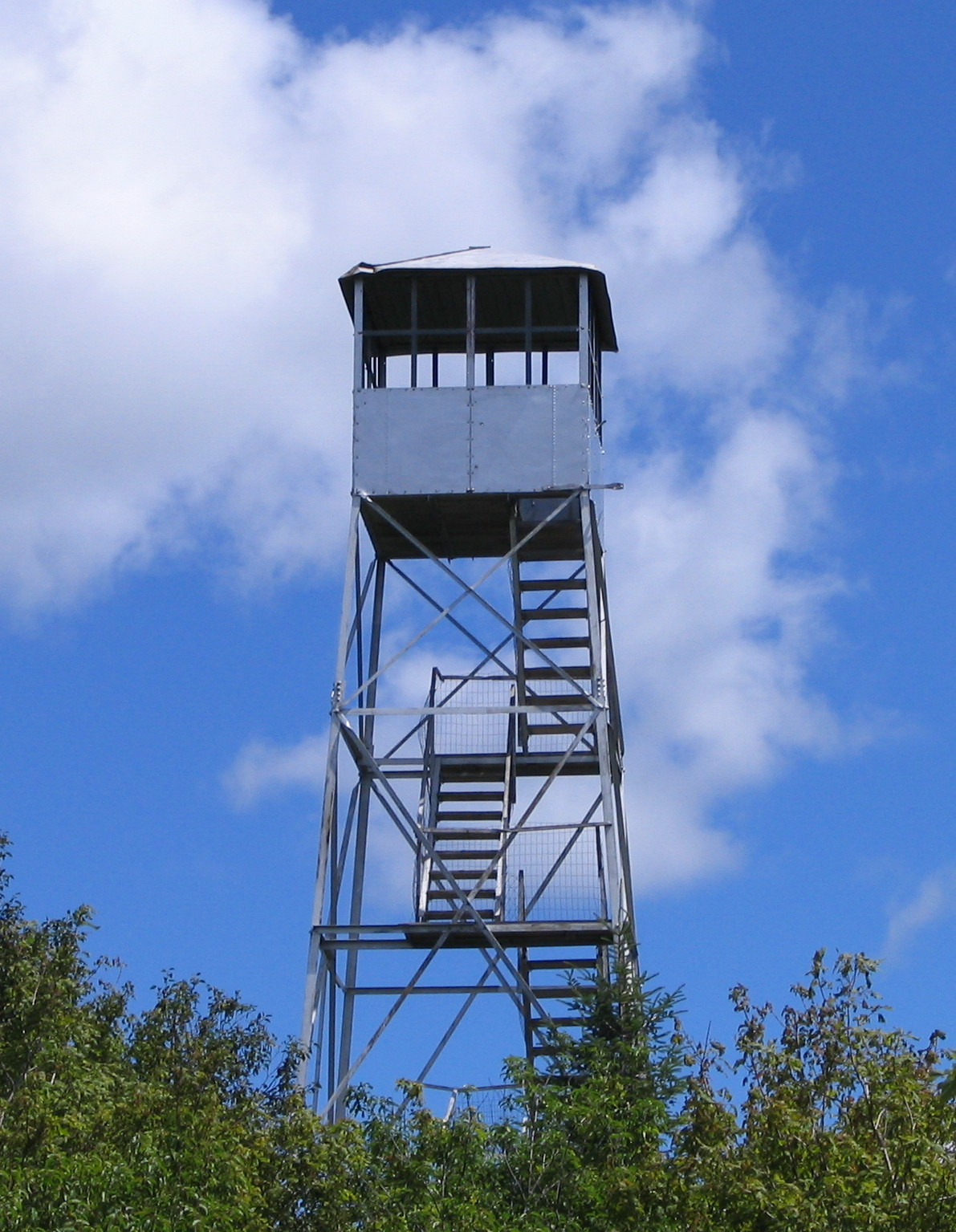
Azure Mountain Fire Observation Station

There is an Adirondack architectural style that relates to the rugged style associated with the Great Camps. The builders of these camps used native building materials and sited their buildings within an irregular wooded landscape. These camps for the wealthy were built to provide a primitive, rustic appearance while avoiding the problems of in-shipping materials from elsewhere.

=== Fire towers ===
In 1903 and 1908 fires consumed nearly 1 million acres (400,000 hectares) of forest. In 1909, the first Adirondack fire lookout tower, made of logs, was erected on Mount Morris and many others were built over the next several years. From 1916 steel towers were built. At one time or another, there have been fire towers at 57 locations in today's Adirondack Park. The system worked for about 60 years, but has since been replaced by other technologies. Today, 34 towers survive in the region and many have been restored and are accessible to the public. Some in the Adirondack Forest Preserve have been listed on the National Register of Historic Places, including those on the following mountains: Arab, Azure, Blue, Hadley, Kane, Loon Lake, Poke-O-Moonshine, St. Regis, Snowy, and Wakely.

=== Industrial ===
McIntyre Furnace & McNaughton Cottage: an 1853 blast furnace, the 1832 McNaughton Cottage, the remains of the Tahawus Club era buildings, and the early mining-related sites.

=== Ecclesiastical ===
St. Regis Presbyterian church: designed by prolific Saranac Lake architect William L. Coulter and built on land donated by Paul Smith. Construction funds came from donations from the congregation, which was largely made up of summer residents. It served as a church from 1899 to 2010.

=== Infrastructure ===
The Bow Bridge: The Bow Bridge in Hadley is one of only two parabolic or lenticular truss bridges in the region and one of only about 50 remaining in the country. It was built over the Sacandaga River by the Berlin Iron Bridge Co. in 1885.

Jay Covered Bridge over the Ausable River.

The AuSable Chasm Bridge.

=== Residential and leisure ===
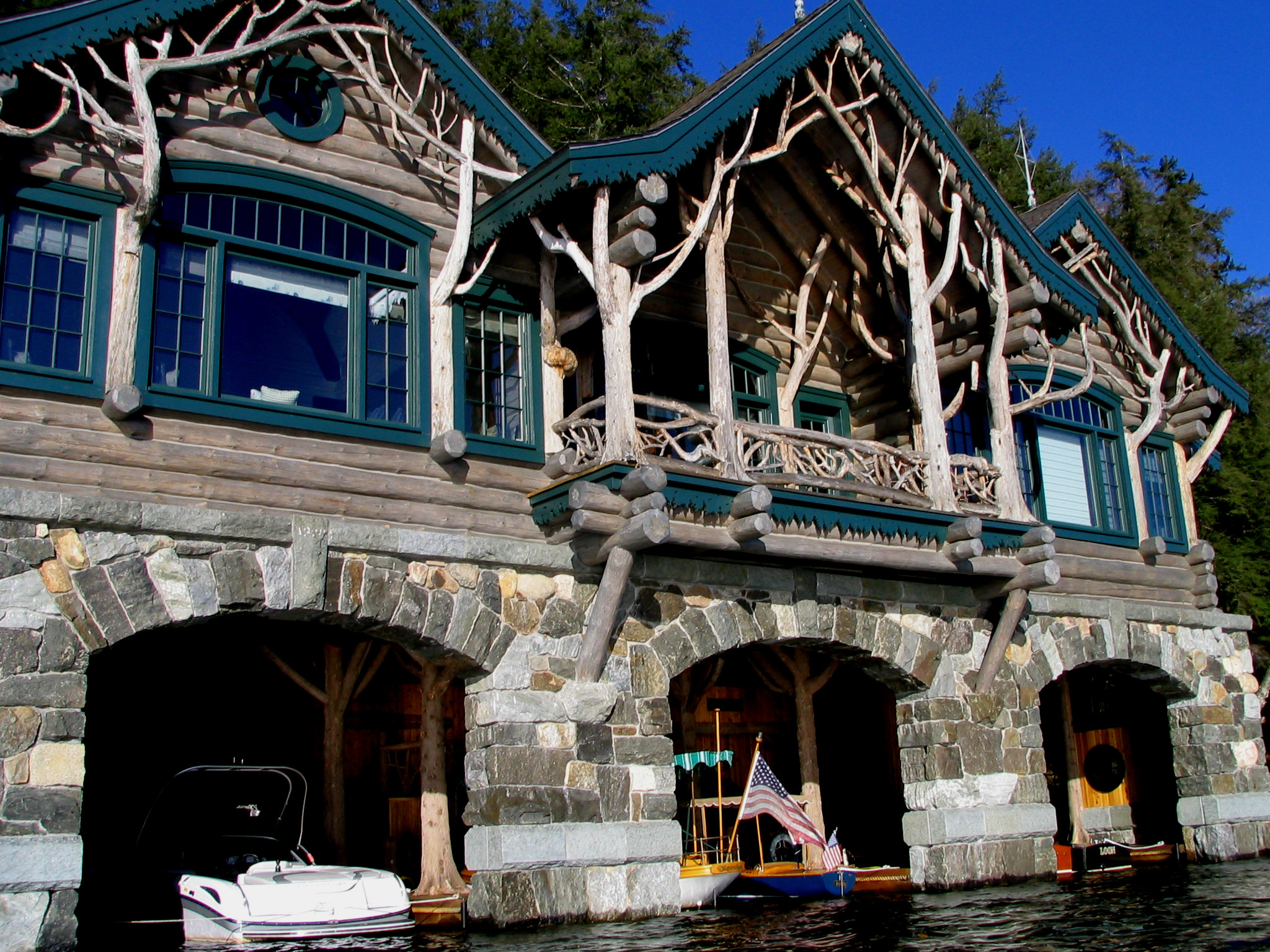
Twig work at Camp Topridge

The Adirondack lean-to is a three sided log shelter.

Saranac Village at Will Rogers: a Tudor Revival style retirement community, was constructed in 1930 as a tuberculosis treatment facility for vaudeville performers. Due to the subsequent decline of vaudeville performers, and an eventual cure for tuberculosis, its doors closed in 1975. After sitting unused for twenty years, it was bought in 1998 by the Alpine Adirondack Association, LLC and reopened in January 2000 as a retirement community.

Camp Santanoni was once a private estate of approximately 13,000 acres (53 km^{2}), and now is the property of the state, at Newcomb. It was a residential complex of about 45 buildings. Now a National Historic Landmark, this is one of the earliest examples of the Great Camps of the Adirondacks. At the time of completion in 1893, Camp Santanoni was regarded as the grandest of all such Adirondack camps.

Wellscroft, at Upper Jay, is a Tudor Revival–style summer estate home. It is a long, 2 1/2-story, building with several projecting bays, porches, gables and dormers, a porte cochere and a service wing. The rear facade features a large semi-circular projection. The first-story exterior is faced in native fieldstone. The interior features a number of Arts and Crafts style design features. Also on the property are a power house, fire house, gazebo, root cellar, reservoir, ruins of the caretaker's house and carriage house, and the remains of the landscaped grounds. It was listed on the National Register of Historic Places in 2004.

Prospect Point Camp: a Great Camp notable for its unusual chalets inspired by European hunting lodges.
