= Rocky Peak Ridge =

Mountain in New York, United States

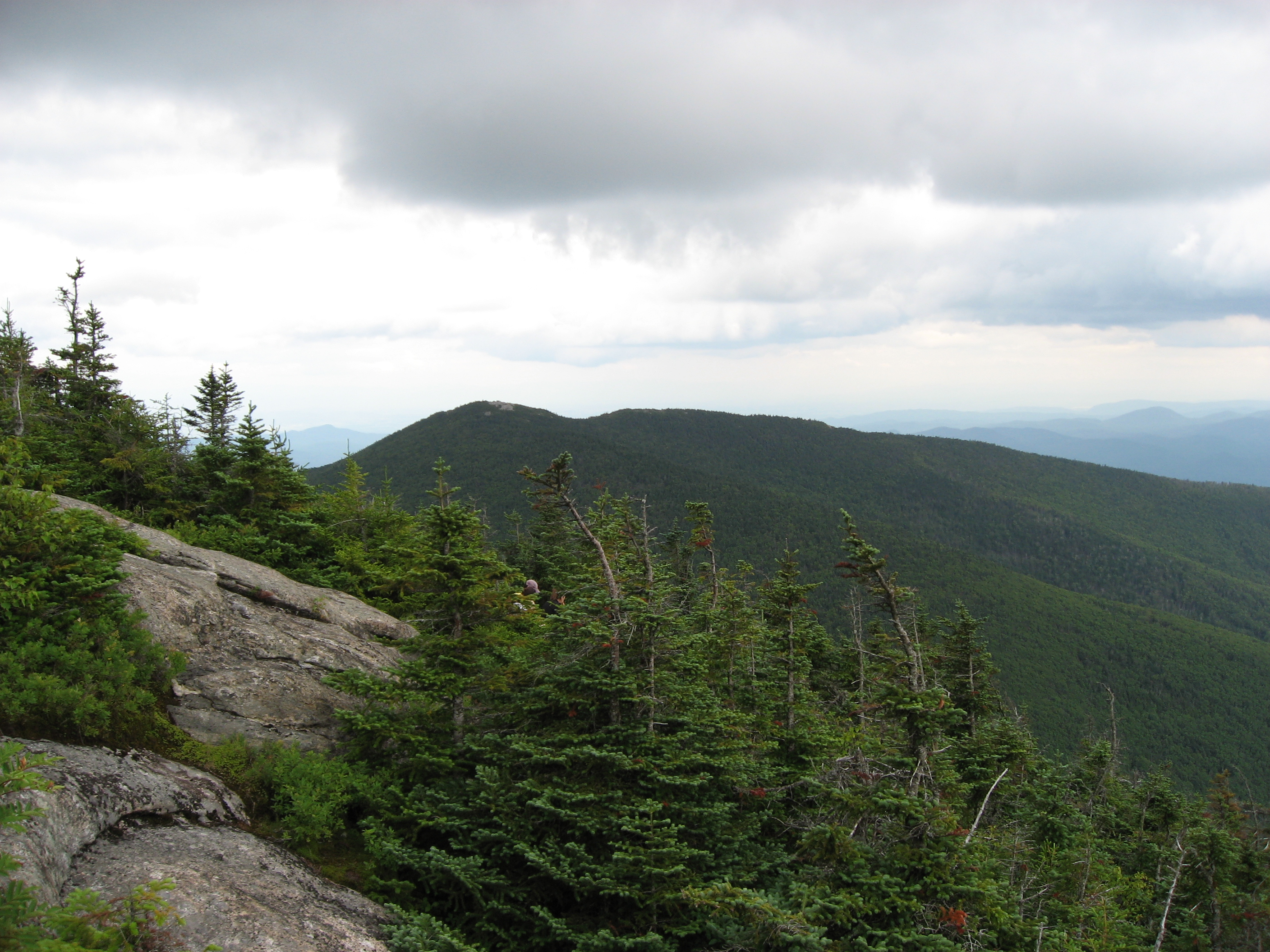
- Rocky Peak seen from Giant Mountain

Highest point
- Elevation: 4,420 ft (1,350 m) NGVD 29
- Listing: Adirondack High Peaks 20th
- Coordinates: 44°09′16″N 73°42′20″W

Geography
- Location within New York Adirondack Park Location within the United States
- Location: Keene, New York, U.S.
- Parent range: Adirondacks
- Topo map: USGS Elizabethtown

Climbing
- First ascent: 1878, by Fred J. Patterson and Sam Dunning
- Easiest route: Hike

Rocky Peak Ridge is a mountain in the Adirondacks in the U.S. state of New York. It is the 20th-highest of the Adirondack High Peaks, with an elevation of 4,420 feet (1,350 m). It is located in the Giant Mountain Wilderness Area, in the town of Keene in Essex County. The mountain is named for its appearance as a rocky ridge to the east of the better-known Giant Mountain. Other early names for the mountain included "Giant's Wife", "Bald Mountain", and "Bald Peak", the last of which now belongs to a shorter nearby peak. The earliest recorded ascent of the mountain was made by trail guides Fred J. Patterson and Sam Dunning in 1878. A major forest fire in 1903 burned the topsoil from the top of the mountain and left it with its distinctive bare ridge.

Rocky Peak Ridge can be climbed from two directions. The East Trail begins at a parking lot on U.S. Route 9, north of its junction with New York State Route 73 and south of New Russia. It continues 1.9 miles (3.1 km) to the Blueberry Cobbles, where it splits in two, with the red trail bypassing the Blueberry Cobbles and the yellow trail passing over them, offering views of the Boquet River and Dix Range. After the trails rejoin in Mason Notch, the route continues over the summits of Mason Mountain and Bald Peak, and then along the ridge to the summit of Rocky Peak Ridge. Near the summit, the trail passes Lake Mary Louise, named for Mary Louise Wicks, a summer visitor in the 19th century. Good views in all directions are available on the peak, including the east face of Giant Mountain. This route has a one-way distance of 6.7 miles (10.8 km) and ascent of 4,700 feet (1,400 m).

The East Trail continues from Rocky Peak Ridge to the col between it and Giant Mountain, and then to the summit of Giant Mountain. This allows Rocky Peak Ridge to instead be approached from the west by first climbing Giant Mountain.
