= Giant Mountain Wilderness Area =

Wilderness area in New York, United States

- IUCN category Ib (wilderness area)
- Location within the United States
- Location: Adirondack Park New York USA
- Nearest city: Keene Valley, NY
- Coordinates: 44.07303°N 73.73508°W
- Area: 23,688 acres (95.86 km^{2})
- Established: 1972
- Governing body: New York State Department of Environmental Conservation

The Giant Mountain Wilderness Area (GMWA) is a protected area of the New York Forest Preserve in Adirondack Park, located in the towns of Elizabethtown and Keene in Essex County. It is roughly bounded by NY 9N on the north, NY 73 on the west and south and US 9 on the east. It contains two prominent Adirondack peaks, Giant Mountain and Rocky Peak Ridge, as well as two bodies of water covering 7 acres (2.8 hectares), 33 miles (53 km) of hiking trails, and a single lean-to. The land was first designated as a wilderness area in 1972.

Much of the old-growth forest in GMWA was logged by timber companies during the 19th century. The land was reacquired by the state to add to the forest preserve in the 20th century. Forest fires in 1903, 1908, and 1909 destroyed one-third of the forest and altered the area's landscape. The 1903 fire stripped Giant Mountain and Rocky Peak Ridge of their topsoil, leaving bare rock that remains exposed at their peaks today. The landscape was also altered by a 1963 storm which formed landslides on the mountains in the area. A variety of forest cover now exists in the area. The higher elevations on the slopes of the mountains contain spruce, balsa, and white birch, while lower elevations contain oak, maple, basswood, and white-ash. Some stands of old-growth eastern hemlock remain near Roaring Brook Falls.

The GMWA is primarily used by hikers, who travel to the mountain summits located within, as well as other geographic features of the area, such as the Giant's Washbowl, a pond on the lower slopes of Giant Mountain, Roraing Brook Falls along Route 73, and Gusty Gap, a sharp col between Giant Mountain and Rocky Peak Ridge. The area is also used by hunters.

== See also ==
- List of Wilderness Areas in the Adirondack Park
