= Ha-De-Ron-Dah Wilderness Area =

Wilderness area in New York, United States

- IUCN category Ib (wilderness area)
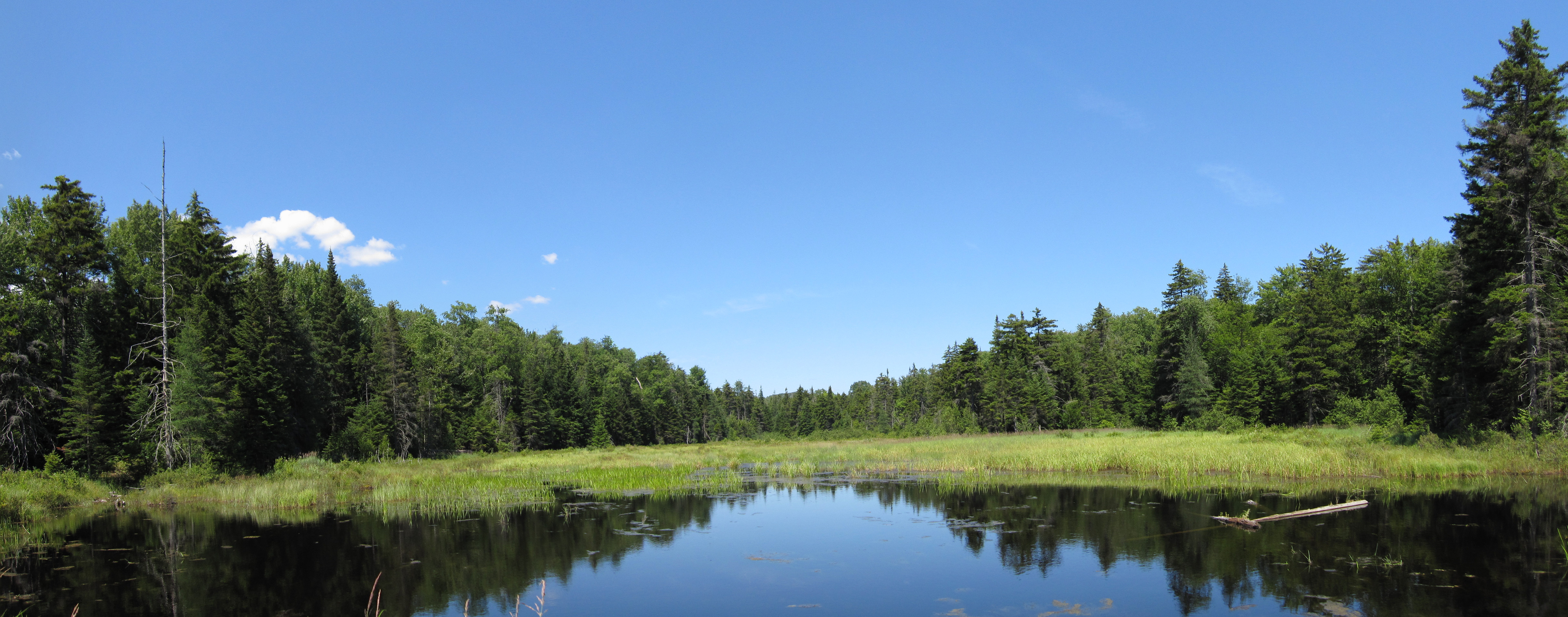

- Location within New York Location within the United States
- Location: Adirondack Park New York USA
- Nearest city: Old Forge, New York, U.S.
- Coordinates: 43°43′23″N 75°04′43″W
- Area: 26,600 acres (10,800 ha)
- Governing body: New York State Department of Environmental Conservation

The Ha-De-Ron-Dah Wilderness Area, an Adirondack Park unit of New York's Forest Preserve, is located in the town of Webb, Herkimer County, and the Town of Greig, Lewis County. It is bounded on the north by private lands in the vicinity of North Pond, Hitchcock Pond, Moose Pond and the headwaters of the Independence River; on the east by private lands along the Remsen to Lake Placid railroad right-of-way; on the south by private lands along New York State Route 28 and by the wood road leading to the Copper Lake property; and on the west by Pine Creek and a DEC maintained foot trail from Pine Creek to Pine Lake, East Pine Pond, and Big Otter Lake.

== Etymology ==
The name "Ha-De-Ron-Dah" is actually a more phonetically accurate version of the Iroquois (specifically Mohawk) word "Adirondack" which roughly translates as "bark-eater". This was a derogatory name used by Iroquois to describe the local Algonquin people. It is speculated that their over-reliance on a hunting and gathering economy led to the need to eat bark over winter when resources in the mountainous area became too scarce.

== Terrain ==
The terrain consists of low rolling hills with many beaver meadows and swamps. Although the area is forest-covered, extensive forest fire damage in the southern half has resulted in much of it now being covered with brush, pin cherry, aspen and bracken fern.

In the northern half, mixed hardwood and softwood stands of trees relatively small in diameter predominate. The exceptions are the scattered individual white pine trees just north of the former truck trail which were not cut in the last logging operation. Some of these trees exceed 100 feet (30 m) in height and are more than 40 inches (102 cm) in diameter.

Public access from the north and south is nearly all blocked by private lands. The same is true for most of the eastern and western boundaries except at the state truck trail entrance near Thendara and the Big Otter jeep road from the west.

== See also ==
- List of Wilderness Areas in the Adirondack Park
