= McKenzie Mountain Wilderness Area =

Wilderness area in New York, United States

- IUCN category Ib (wilderness area)
- Location within the United States
- Location: Adirondack Park New York USA
- Nearest city: North River, NY
- Coordinates: 44°21′50″N 73°59′30″W
- Area: 37,616 acres (152.23 km^{2})
- Governing body: New York State Department of Environmental Conservation

The McKenzie Mountain Wilderness Area, an Adirondack Park unit of the Forest Preserve, lies in western Essex County in the towns of St. Armand, North Elba and Wilmington. In general, the Saranac River and Franklin Falls Pond border on the north; the Wilmington-Franklin Falls road, the Whiteface Mountain Memorial Highway and the west branch of the Ausable River form the eastern boundary; the Saranac Lake-Lake Placid Road, NY 86, forms the southern boundary; and the Saranac River forms the western boundary.

It contains eight bodies of water covering 28 acres (11 hectares), 14.2 miles (22.9 km) of foot trails, and one lean-to.

McKenzie Mountain, sometimes referred to as Saddleback, and Moose Mountain, sometimes called St. Armand Mountain, dominate the topographical features of the area.

McKenzie Pond, from which the village of Saranac Lake obtains its water supply, forms part of the boundary on the west side as does Moose Pond, but few ponds are encompassed within the boundaries of this area. Bartlett Pond, lying at about 2,800 feet (850 m) altitude on the southeast side of McKenzie Mountain, and Loch Bonnie which is at about 2,900 feet (880 m) altitude on the southeast side of Moose Mountain are, however, in the wilderness.

The area is densely forested with softwoods, with spruce and balsam predominating above the 2,500-foot (760 m) level and mixed hardwoods and softwoods predominating at the lower elevations.

The attractiveness of the area is enhanced by the excellent views that may be obtained from the top of McKenzie Mountain and Moose Mountain. There are numerous spring-fed brooks, mostly on the north slopes of the area. Lincoln Brook and French Brook, with their tributaries originating high on the northwest slopes of Esther Mountain and Whiteface Mountain, are crystal clear trout streams with many scenic spots along their courses.

DEC maintains a foot trail from the pull-off east of the Saranac Lake Golf Course on Route 86 to the top of McKenzie Mountain. The Lake Placid Shore Owners Association trail over private lands along the west shore of Lake Placid is open to those who obtain the association's permission to use it. After leaving private land this trail winds its way to the tops of Moose, McKenzie, Tamarac and Colburn Mountains.

Public access to the area is relatively good from all sides.

== See also ==
- List of Wilderness Areas in the Adirondack Park
