= Pigeon Lake Wilderness Area =

Wilderness area in New York, United States

- IUCN category Ib (wilderness area)
- Location within the United States
- Location: Adirondack Park New York USA
- Nearest city: Webb, NY
- Coordinates: 43°47′54″N 74°46′08″W
- Area: 50,100 acres (20,300 ha)
- Governing body: New York State Department of Environmental Conservation

The Pigeon Lake Wilderness Area, an Adirondack Park unit of the forest preserve, lies in the town of Webb, Herkimer County, and the towns of Long Lake and Inlet in Hamilton County. It is bounded on the north by Stillwater Reservoir and large blocks of private land in the vicinity of Rose Pond, Shingle Shanty Pond and Upper Sister Lake; on the east by a private road from Brandreth Lake to North Point and by Raquette Lake; on the south by private lands along the Uncas Road; and on the west by the Big Moose Road, private lands near Big Moose Lake, Thirsty Pond, Twitchell Lake, Razorback Pond, and the Remsen to Lake Placid railroad tracks.

The terrain consists of low, rolling hills, with the exception of West Mountain near the eastern boundary. There are many brook trout ponds and streams and a considerable expanse of swampland along the courses of Sucker Brook and Beaver Brook.

The forest cover runs to mature or near-mature mixed softwoods and hardwoods, with some dense spruce-balsam types near the summit of West Mountain and in the swamplands. Old-growth white pine can be found in the vicinity of Pigeon Lake and a few other places.

It is easily accessible to the public from the south, southeast and southwest, but to a lesser extent from the west and north because of posted private lands. The chief attractions for the public are the trout ponds, which entice fishermen as well as campers who frequent scenic spots around Cascade Lake, Queer Lake, Constable Pond, Pigeon Lake and Gull Lake. It is also a popular area for hunters during the big game season.

The New York State Department of Environmental Conservation maintains Brown Tract Pond Campground on the southeast perimeter. Motorboats are now banned from operating on Brown Tract Ponds to provide a more compatible situation for canoes and other non-motorized boats utilized by the campers.

== See also ==
- List of Wilderness Areas in the Adirondack Park
