= Pepperbox Wilderness Area =

Wilderness area in Adirondack Park

- IUCN category Ib (wilderness area)
- Location within the United States
- Location: Adirondack Park New York USA
- Nearest city: Webb, NY
- Coordinates: 43°56′05″N 75°03′09″W
- Area: 23,816 acres (9,638 ha)
- Governing body: New York State Department of Environmental Conservation

The Pepperbox Wilderness Area, an Adirondack Park unit of the New York Forest Preserve, lies entirely within the town of Webb in Herkimer County. Stillwater Reservoir and the Beaver River Primitive Area form the southern boundary, while the north bank of the West Branch of the Oswegatchie River generally forms the northern boundary. The western boundary is the county line, and the eastern boundary is the Raven Lake Road and the Five Ponds Wilderness Area.

It contains 46 bodies of water on 270 acres (1.1 km^{2}) and 2 miles (3.2 km) of foot trails.

The terrain is primarily flat, but for a few tinier, rolling hills scattered here and there. The three principal tree species found in swampland are spruce, fir, and red maple. There are also many of alder swamps, marshes, and beaver flows. The drier sites are vegetated with pole-size northern hardwoods. The entire area appears to have been heavily burned over and logged in the past and is not particularly scenic by usual standards. It is, however, ideally suited for snowshoeing and cross-country skiing.

Several ponds are found in the area. They are generally of low productivity and some may even be sterile. The area is classed as wilderness because of its remoteness and also due to the extensive wetland ecosystems involved. The flora and fauna associated with moist ecosystems, such as found in the Pepperbox, seem to exhibit more species diversity than any others in the Adirondacks. Birdlife and small mammals are especially abundant.

There is very little human use of the area at present, except for light hunting. Access is moderately difficult because of the distance from public roads and the lack of a trail system.

== Popular culture ==
The Pepperbox Wilderness Area was the initial inspiration for the StoneJam Game Jam, held in the Stoneham Mountain Resort on 10 July 2015.

== See also ==
- List of Wilderness Areas in the Adirondack Park
