= Sentinel Range Wilderness Area =

Wilderness area in New York, United States

- IUCN category Ib (wilderness area)
- Location within the United States
- Location: Adirondack Park New York United States
- Nearest city: Wilmington, NY
- Coordinates: 44°18′13″N 73°52′18″W
- Area: 23,874 acres (96.61 km^{2})
- Governing body: New York State Department of Environmental Conservation

The Sentinel Range Wilderness Area, an Adirondack Park unit of New York's Forest Preserve, is located in the towns of Wilmington, North Elba and Keene, Essex County. It is bounded by NY 86 on the north, NY 73 on the south, and private lands on the east and west.

The area contains 5 bodies of water covering 74 acres (29.6 ha), 13.8 miles (22.2 km) of foot trails, and a lean-to.

The Sentinel Range and its slopes dominate the area and five small ponds are situated near the northern and northwestern boundaries. Sentinel Mountain and the general northeastern quarter of the area are characterized by bare rock outcropping that resulted from forest fires more than a half century ago. The terrain is steep and rugged, with some vertical cliffs facing north and northeast.

The eastern slopes of the area have a hardwood forest that regenerated after the forest fires. There are mixed hardwood and softwood stands, primarily along brooks on the eastern slopes. The remainder of the area has a mixed hardwood-softwood cover with some small pockets of white pine between ledges near the northern boundary.

Good views may be obtained from the top of Sentinel and Pitchoff Mountains, but forest cover restricts the view of Kelburn Mountain, Stewart Mountain, Slide Mountain and Black Mountain. There is an excellent view of the Wilmington Notch-Whiteface Mountain section from a lean-to site on the south side of Copperas Pond.

More than thirty years ago a ski trail was constructed from the west boundary to South Notch, and a lean-to was constructed at the terminus in the Notch. The trail was reported to have been little used for skiing, but is maintained as a foot trail. The lean-to was eliminated because of deterioration and lack of use.

The major portion of the perimeter is readily accessible to the public from highways but has not been as susceptible to penetration as some of the less rugged state land because of its terrain.

== See also ==
- List of Wilderness Areas in the Adirondack Park
