= Hoffman Notch Wilderness Area =

Protected area in New York, US

- IUCN category Ib (wilderness area)
- Location within New York Location within the United States
- Location: Adirondack Park New York USA
- Nearest city: North River, NY
- Coordinates: 43.90071°N 73.83551°W
- Area: 38,488 acres (15,576 ha)
- Governing body: New York State Department of Environmental Conservation

The Hoffman Notch Wilderness Area, an Adirondack Park unit of the Forest Preserve, lies in the towns of Schroon, North Hudson and Minerva in Essex County. It is bounded on the north by private lands lying south of the Blue Ridge Road and the Sand Pond Mountain tract donated to the state by Finch, Pruyn and Company for fish and wildlife management and silvicultural research and experimentation purposes. It's bound on the east by Interstate 87 and private lands immediately west of the Northway, on the south by private lands lying north of the Loch Muller Road and on the west by the jeep road and trail that extends from Irishtown along Minerva Stream northward to the Blue Ridge Road near Cheney Pond.

The area contains 8 bodies of water covering 156 acres (62.4 ha) and 30 miles (48.3 km) of foot trails.

== Geography ==
The area is mountainous and rugged with three north–south ridges in excess of 3,000 feet (914 m) dominating the area: Blue Ridge, Texas Ridge and Washburn Ridge.

== Geology ==
=== Flora ===
The forest cover ranges from second growth hardwoods of sapling and pole-size to nearly solid conifer stands of near mature size at the higher elevations. On some of the better soil, exceptionally large diameter hardwoods occur.

== See also ==
- List of Wilderness Areas in the Adirondack Park
