= Pack basket =

Basket designed to be worn on the back

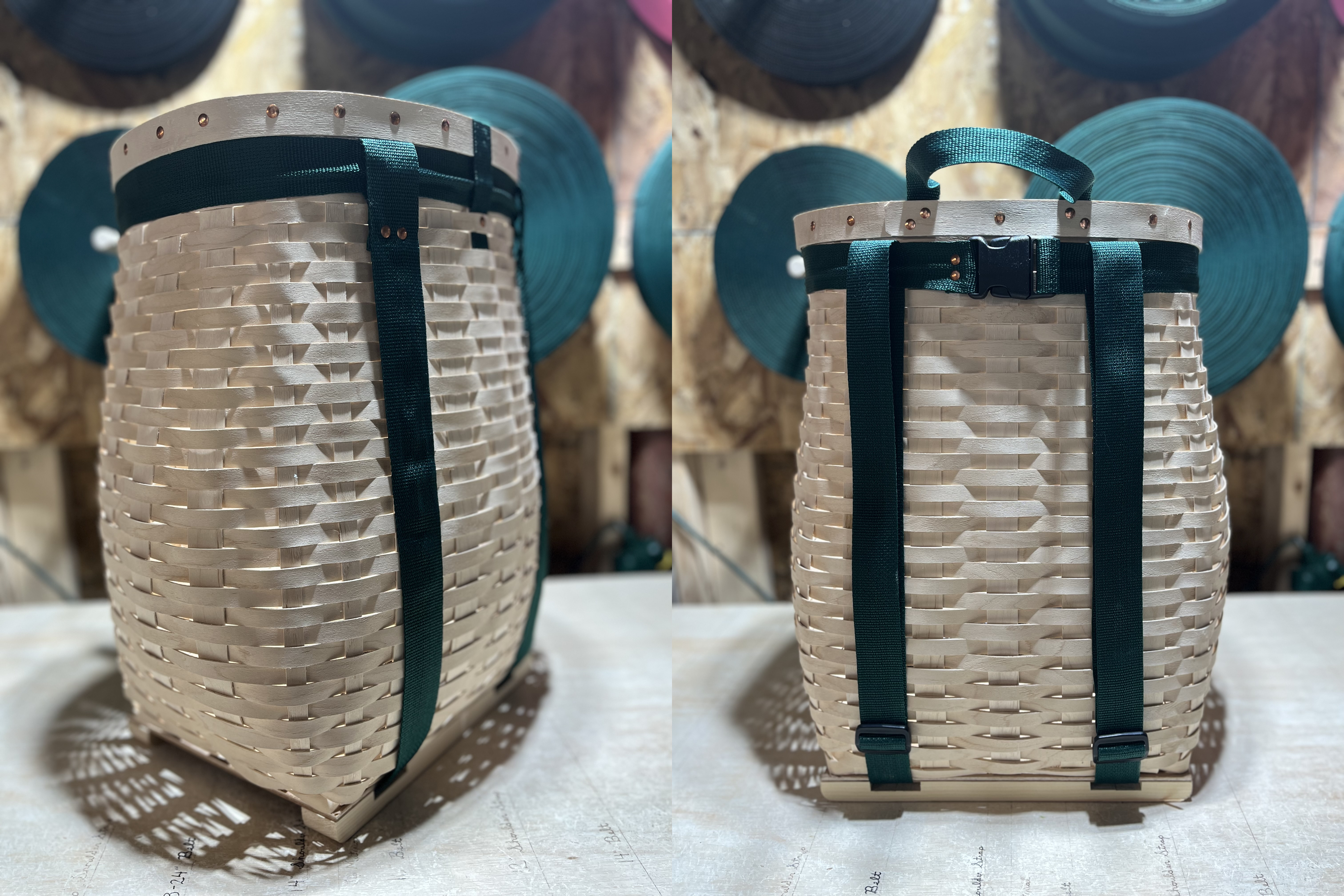
A modern pack basket manufactured by Pack Baskets of Maine.

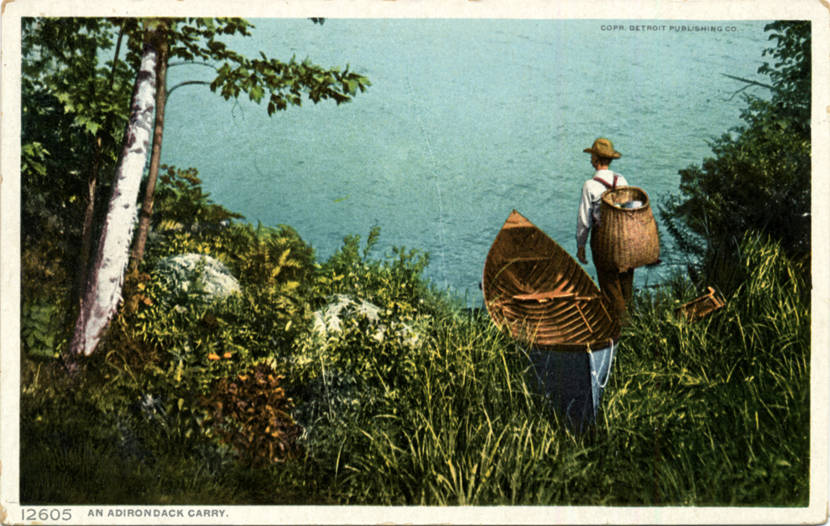
A postcard showing a man carrying a pack basket.

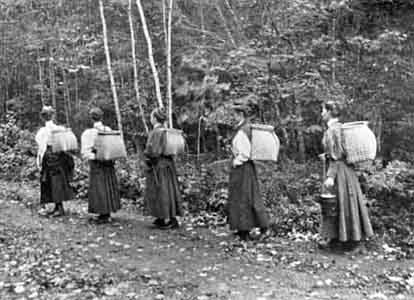
Women in the Adirondacks carrying pack baskets.

A pack basket (or packbasket) is a type of basket with straps designed to be carried as a backpack. Archaeological evidence of Native American pack baskets dates as far back as 900 BCE. Modern pack baskets derive from adaptations made to the Indigenous designs by French Settlers. Today, they are typically referred to as Adirondack pack baskets due to their association with the Adirondack Mountains of New York State.

== Manufacture ==
Pack baskets are traditionally made from black ash, willow, or in modern times, reed. Traditionally, material was sourced from live ash trees, but in modern times logs are used. Wood is split into strips, and thinner horizontal strips are woven around thicker vertical strips. Modern pack baskets include additional features to improve durability and function, including wooden feet on the bottom and a structured interior base.

In their traditional usage, pack baskets were made by the individual intended user, rather than a single crafter making many. As a result, the shapes and sizes of the baskets varied widely.

== History ==
Pack baskets have traditionally been used by trappers, hunters, and fishers to carry equipment. Their use by Adirondack guides for tourists in the 19th century has led to an association with traditional Adirondack imagery, alongside items such as the Adirondack guideboat.

== Gallery ==
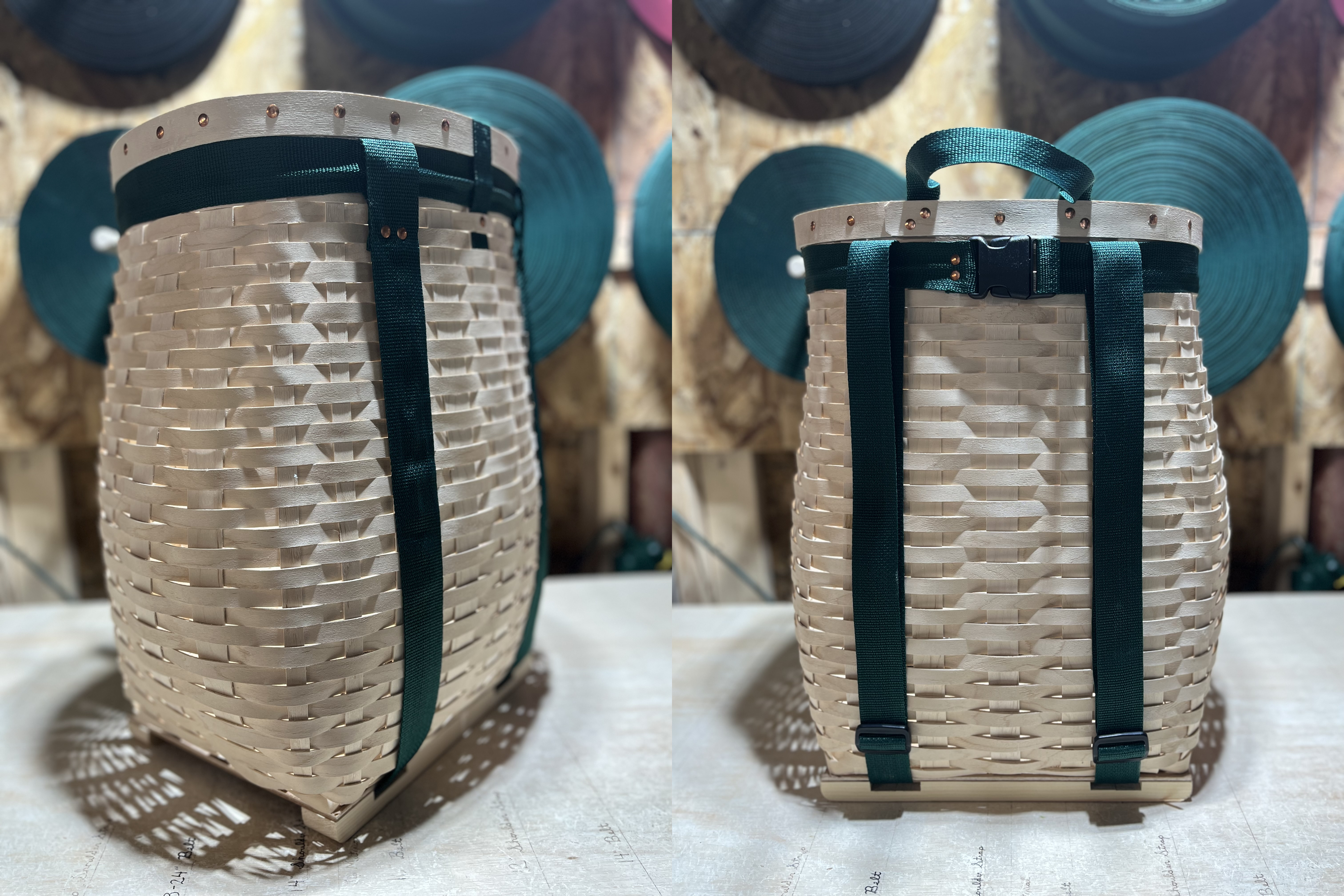
A modern pack basket manufactured by Pack Baskets of Maine.

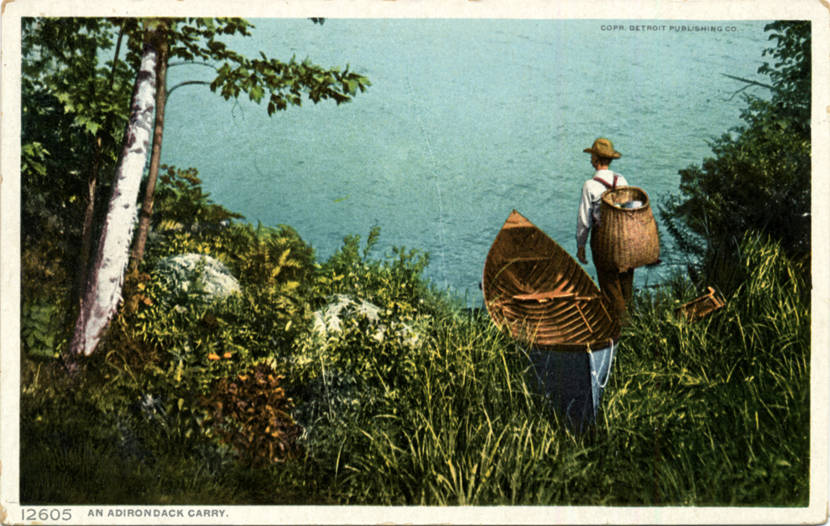
A postcard showing a man carrying a pack basket.

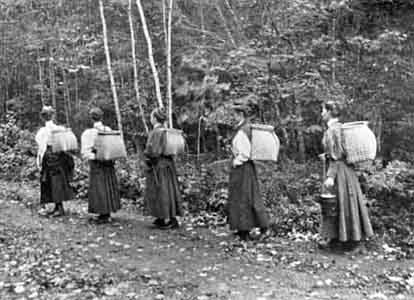
Women in the Adirondacks carrying pack baskets.
