= Cranberry Lake (disambiguation) =

Cranberry Lake is a lake in New York.

Cranberry Lake may also refer to:

- Cranberry, British Columbia, formerly known as Cranberry Lake
- Cranberry Lake 50, a hiking trail around Cranberry Lake
- Cranberry Lake, New York, a hamlet on the northern shore of Cranberry Lake
- Cranberry Lake (Nova Scotia), multiple lakes in Nova Scotia
- Cranberry Lake (Ontario), a lake in Ontario, Canada
- Cranberry Lake (Washington), a lake on Whidbey Island in the US state of Washington
