= Round Lake (lake), New York =

Lake in Hamilton County, New York, United States

Coordinates: 44°4′20″N 74°35′0″W

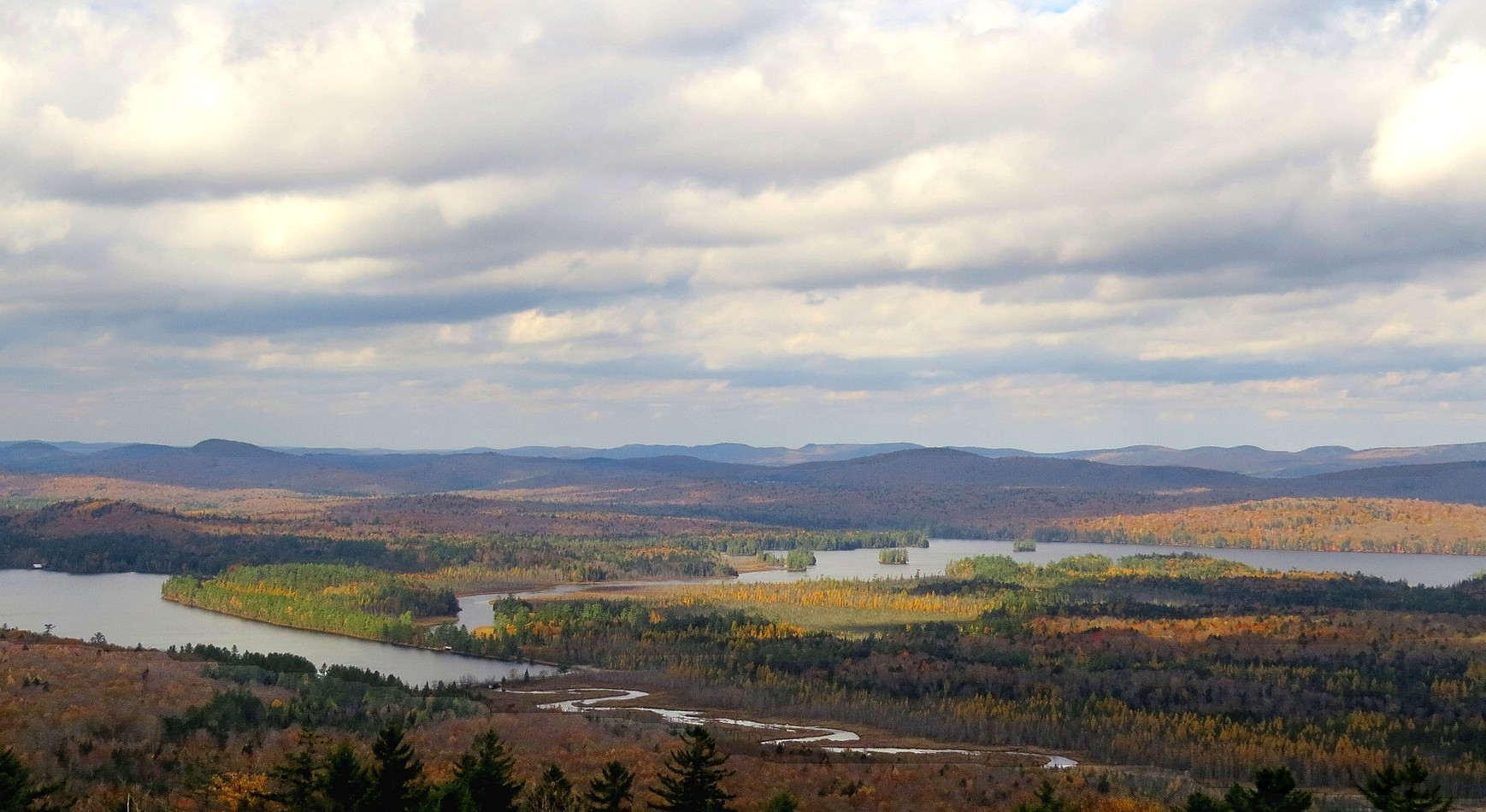
Round Lake, right, and part of Little Tupper Lake, shot from Buck Mountain

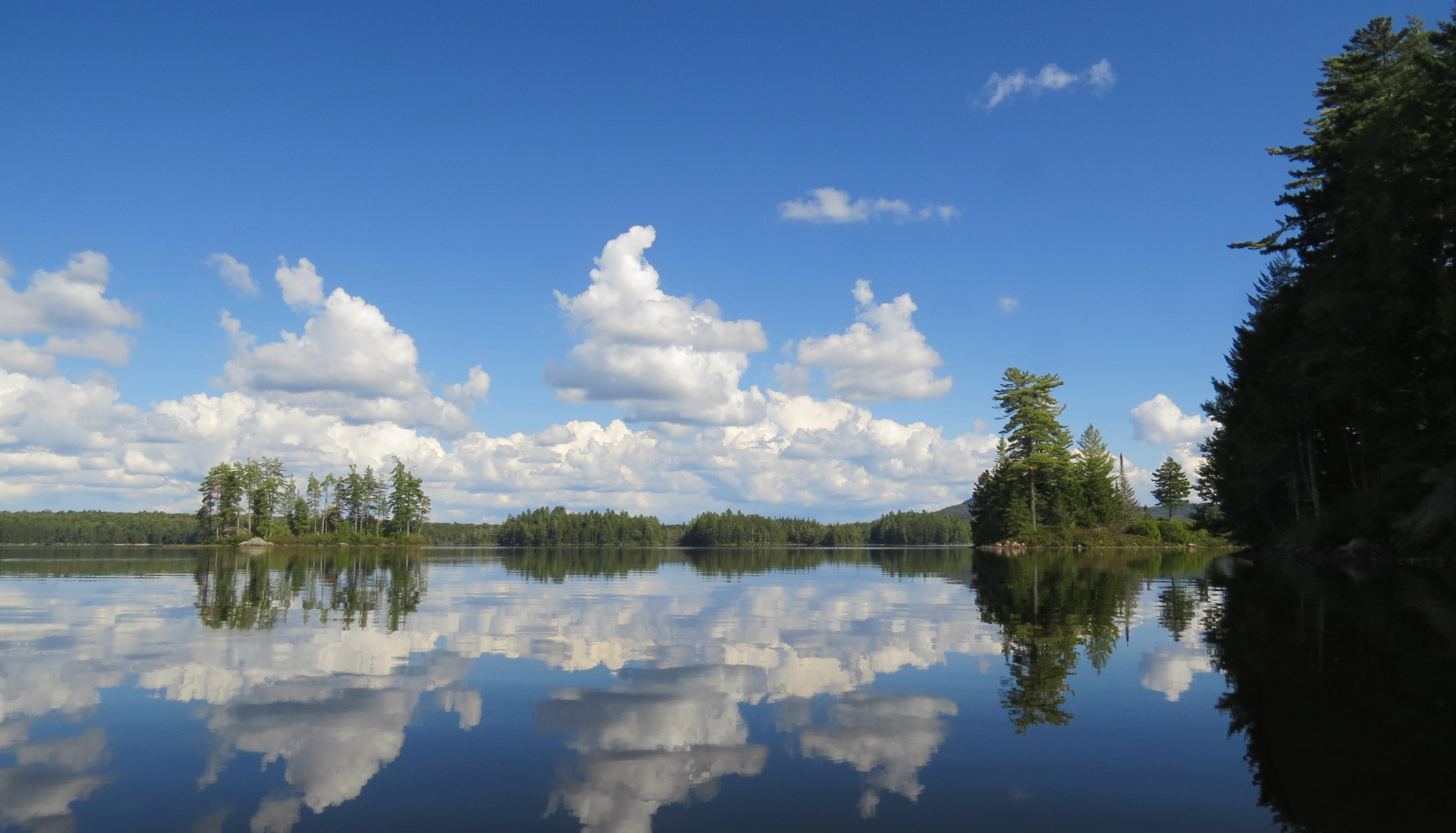
Round Lake from the water

Round Lake is a 744-acre (301-hectare) lake in the town of Long Lake, Hamilton County, New York, US. It is the centerpiece of the 11,430-acre (4,630 ha) Round Lake Wilderness Area are part of the Adirondack Forest Preserve, adjacent to the 19,500-acre (7,900 ha) William C. Whitney Wilderness in the Adirondack Park.

Of the 100 largest lakes in the park, it is one of only five which are free of motorboats, jetskis, and floatplanes, including Lows, Lake Lila, Little Tupper, and Saint Regis Pond.

There are eleven designated primitive campsites on Round Lake, created in 2007.
