= Five Ponds Wilderness Area =

Wilderness area in New York, United States

- IUCN category Ib (wilderness area)
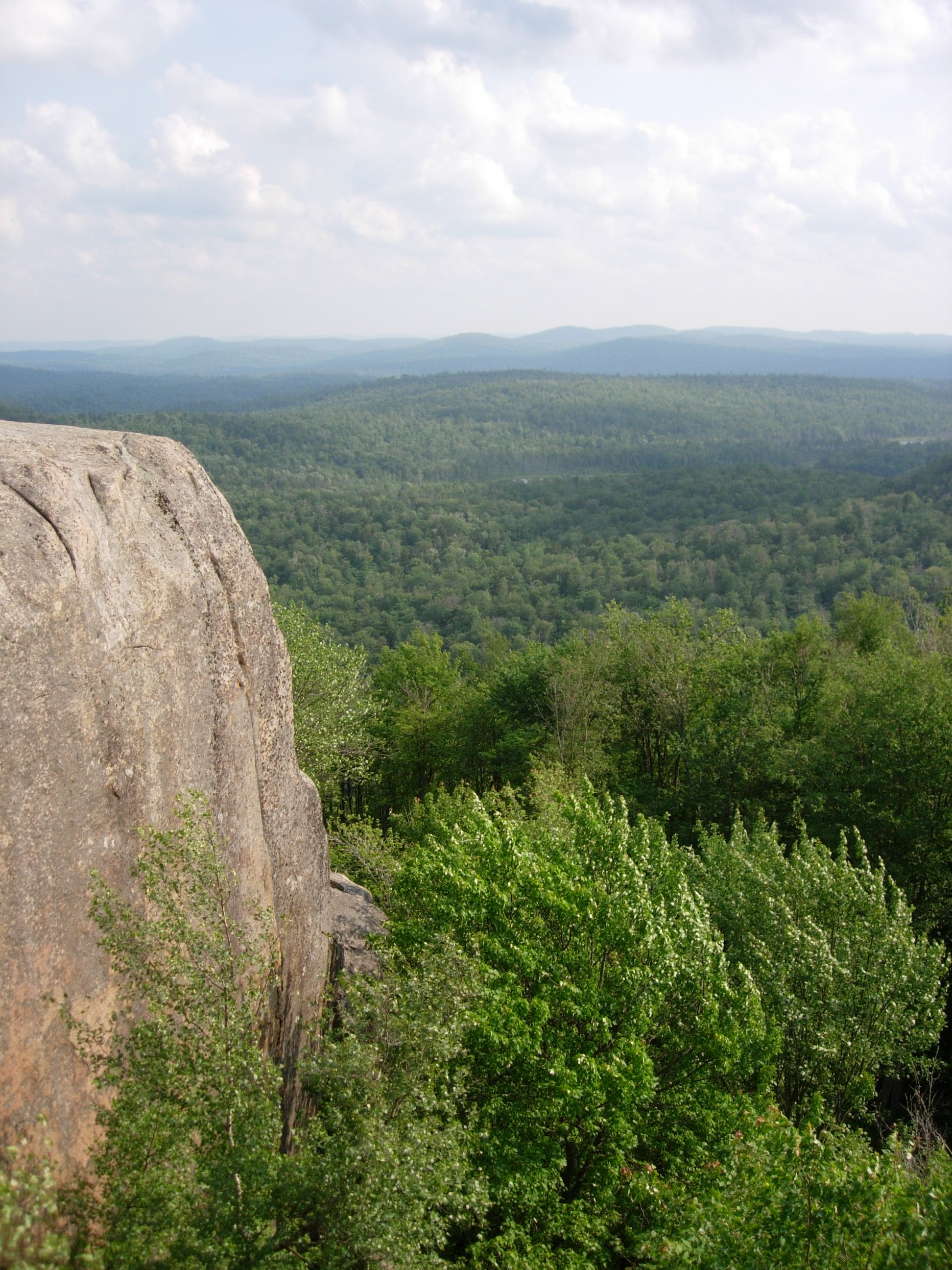
- View over Five Ponds Wilderness Area from Cat Mountain

- Location within the United States
- Location: Adirondack Park New York USA
- Nearest city: Wanakena, NY
- Coordinates: 44.04457°N 74.93251°W
- Area: 117,978 acres (47,744 ha)
- Governing body: New York State Department of Environmental Conservation

The Five Ponds Wilderness Area, an Adirondack Park unit of New York's Forest Preserve, is located in the towns of Fine and Clifton in St. Lawrence County, the town of Webb in Herkimer County and the town of Long Lake in Hamilton County. The 107,230-acre (434 km^{2}) wilderness area includes 1,064 acres (4.3 km^{2}) of private inholdings, 99 bodies of water covering 1,964 acres (7.9 km^{2}), 57.9 miles (93.2 km) of trails, and 14 lean-tos.

== Geography ==
The area is bounded on the north by Cranberry Lake, a portion of the Oswegatchie River, the road leading to Inlet and private lands; on the east by the Colton town line and private lands in the vicinity of Gull Lake, a road leading to Gull Lake and the Remsen to Lake Placid railroad; on the south by Stillwater Reservoir; on the southwest by the Pepperbox Wilderness Area and on the west by the Aldrich Pond Wild Forest and the Watson East Triangle Wild Forest. In the vicinity of Young's Road the wild forest and wilderness boundary is the Streeter Lake snowmobile trail. Land south and east of this boundary will be classified wilderness upon acquisition of inholdings.

The terrain is low, rolling and interspersed with many small ponds. Swamp areas and small brooks are numerous. The forest cover varies from pole-size hardwoods in the sections that were heavily logged and burned more than forty years ago to virgin pine and spruce stands.

=== Forest ===
This is one of the few locations in the northeastern United States where stands of virgin timber can be found. The Rich Lumber Company owned the land tract north of the St. Lawrence County line from 1903 to 1914. Although some logging was done before 1903, the bulk of it occurred during this time period, when a railroad was put in to remove the large white pine logs. Part of Glasby Creek was not logged and some of the tall white pines still stand along the State Trail. The East Branch Oswegatchie on the parts across from High Rock still has very tall white pines, across it on an adjacent tract of state land, that was acquired by New York State in a tax sale in 1884.

Several fires burned large areas south of Cranberry Lake. The blowdowns of 1950 and 1995 did considerably more damage. South of the St. Lawrence County Line was owned by William Seward Webb, and was never commercially lumbered; this area was sold to New York State in 1896. It holds the largest unlogged tract anywhere in the Eastern United States. It has been considerably damaged by both blowdowns, including over half of the esker at Five Ponds. The old growth pine and red spruce stand on the esker between Big Five, Little Five and Big Shallow, Little Shallow and Washbowl ponds is an example of this virgin timber.

Slightly south of the St. Lawrence-Herkimer-Hamilton county marker stands what is (arguably) the largest virgin White Pine in the Adirondacks. Recent tree surveys have found one white pine standing at 144 feet tall, however, none over 150 feet tall have been found there yet. The virgin pine stand at Pine Ridge near the East Branch of the Oswegatchie is another well known spot where examples of original growth timber may be seen. However, portions of the Pine Ridge stand were completely blown down in the 1950 hurricane. Most of the remainder of Pine Ridge was destroyed in the blowdown of 1995. The Adirondack Park Agency ruled to leave the downed timber untouched. Camp Johnny, a nearby rise of land and popular camping spot remained untouched. There is extreme blowdown in the Cat Mountain area and in the very remote and nearly untraveled Riley Ponds section of the Five Ponds Wilderness Area.

Extremely difficult traveling conditions remain, where crisscrossing blowdown exists, with bushes, small trees and witch-hobble grown up through. The Toad Pond area, on the very remote Robinson River area, has piles of Spruce blowdown. Not all areas have this extreme of blowdown— the southern portion of the Five Ponds Wilderness on the Red Horse Chain of Lakes (Salmon Lake, Witchopple Lake, and Clear Lake) has much of the forest in the valley areas still intact. Many white pines are standing on the Red Horse Creek, where the State Trail follows, forming a kind of double canopy in places. Very large Yellow Birch and Black Cherries can be found in places, near Clear Lake on Covey Pond Hill. Most of the large spruce around Mud Pond and the Clear Lake area have died off or have been blown down. One, on the northwest side of Clear Lake is over one hundred feet tall.

There are places that are seldom travelled, especially southeast of Sand Lake, west of Crooked Lake, and north of the Middle Branch of the Oswegatchie River. A large Carpet Spruce swamp exists in this area, intermixed with blowdown and rocks. The Middle Branch of the Oswegatchie, west of Willy's Lake and north of a private inholding at Bear Pond is not canoe-able.

== Recreation ==
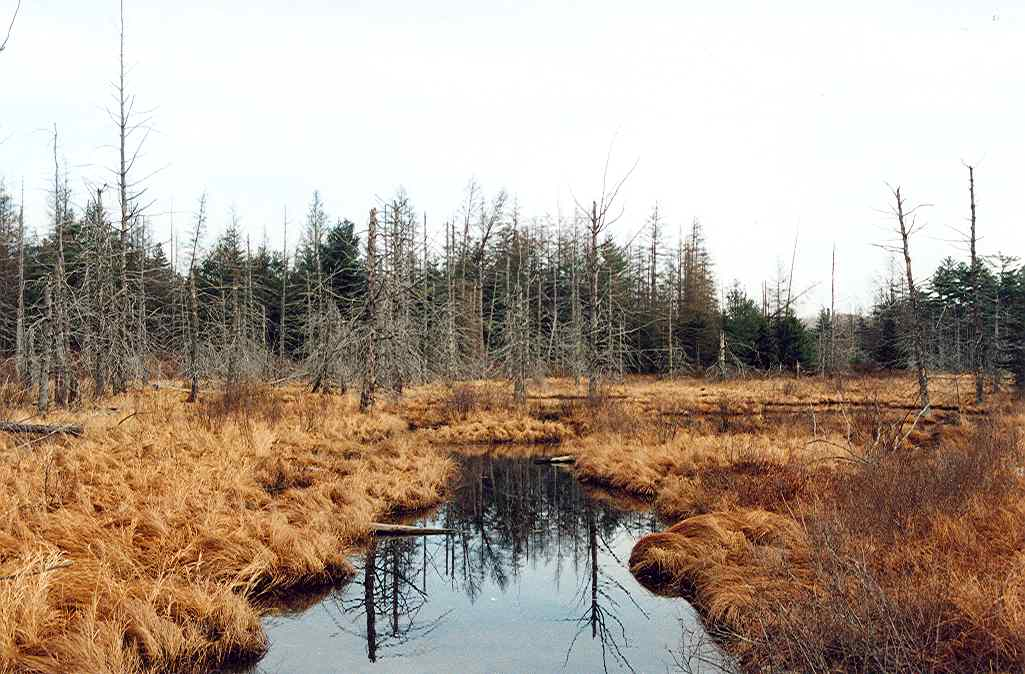
View of The Plains in December

In addition to these spots, other points of interest to the hiker, camper and fisherman are: High Falls on the Oswegatchie River; Alder Bed Flow on the Middle Branch of the Oswegatchie River; Cat Mountain; Sand Lake; Wolf Pond; Big Deer Pond; Nicks Pond; "The Plains", which are very similar in soil and cover type to that of the Moose River Plains; and the numerous, clear, spring-fed ponds, most of which support brook trout.

=== Fishing ===
The East Branch of the Oswegatchie River was long considered the top brook trout stream in the state, with catches of three to four pound brook trout common during the summer months. This distinction was lost when northern pike were apparently introduced accidentally or otherwise into Cranberry Lake several years ago, with adverse impacts to the brook trout population. At the present time, the area is popular with hunters and fishermen who frequent the interior ponds.

=== Canoeing ===
The East Branch of the Oswegatchie is a fine canoeing stream and is used as such to reach interior wilderness points of interest. The river has received increasing use in recent years and care must be taken that such use does not result in resource degradation. There is a 3.5 mile canoe carry at approximately 18 miles upstream that leads the traveler to Lows Lake via Big Deer Pond. The existing lean-tos on the river will be phased out and ultimately replaced by primitive tent sites. There is also a canoe carry from Chair Rock Creeks' inlet on Cranberry Lake to Grass Pond on Lows Lake.

== Public access ==
The Five Ponds area is accessible to the public from the north and also from the south if one has a boat or canoe, from the east from the vicinity of Lake Lila in the William C. Whitney Wilderness Area and along the Remsen to Lake Placid railroad. The area can also be reached from the southwest via the Raven Lake primitive corridor, and from the east, by boat or canoe, via the Bog River/Lows Lake tract. The western boundary in Herkimer County is accessible from the Bear Pond Road in the Aldrich Pond Wild Forest.

== See also ==
- List of Wilderness Areas in the Adirondack Park
