= Round Lake Wilderness Area =

Wilderness area in New York, United States

- IUCN category Ib (wilderness area)
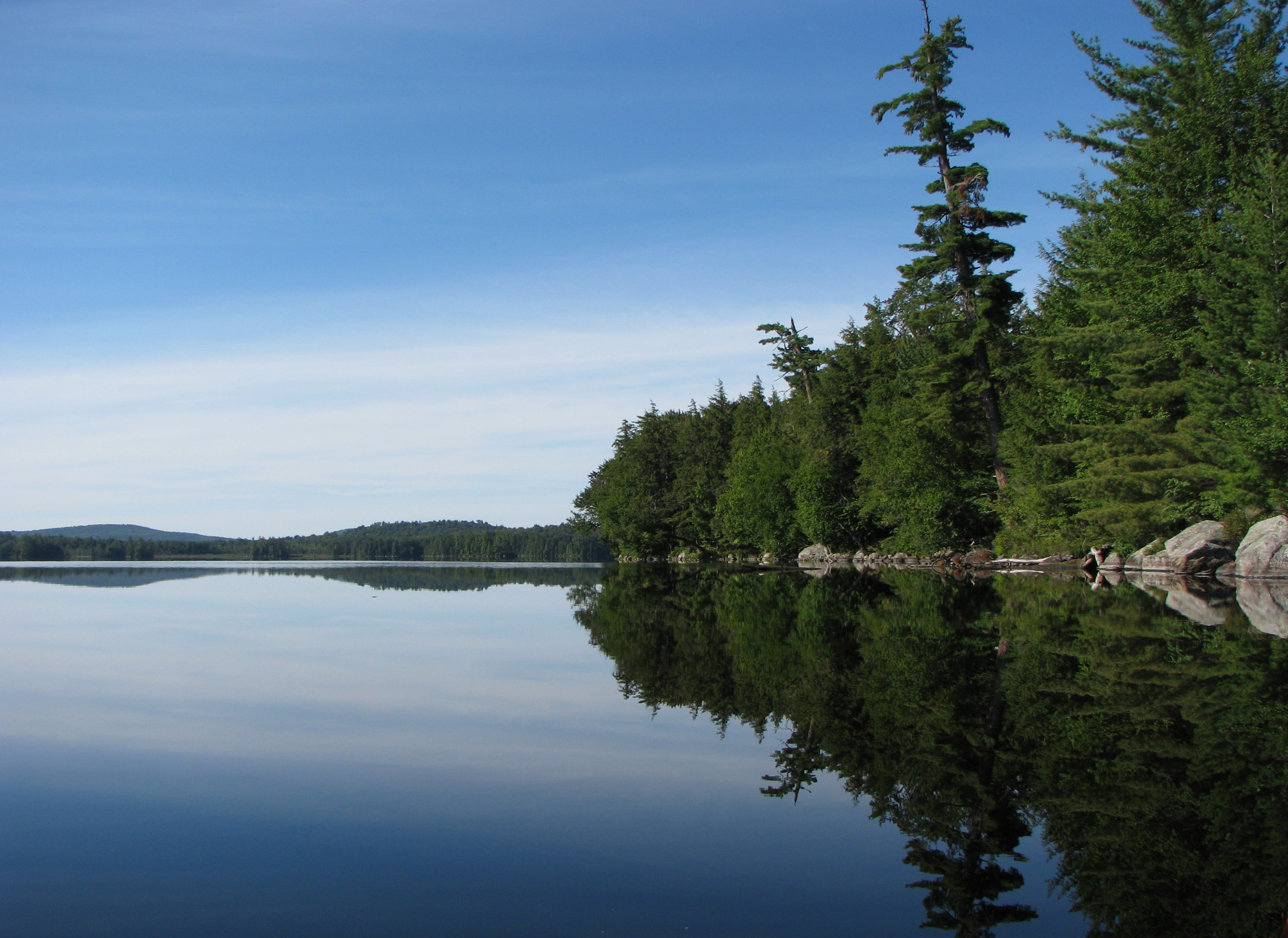
- Round Lake

- Location within the United States
- Location: Adirondack Park New York USA
- Nearest city: Tupper Lake, NY
- Coordinates: 44°04′15″N 74°35′07″W
- Area: 11,000 acres (4,452 ha)
- Created: 2005
- Governing body: New York State Department of Environmental Conservation

The Round Lake Wilderness Area, an Adirondack Park unit of New York's Forest Preserve, is located in the town of Long Lake in Hamilton County. It is adjacent to the William C. Whitney Wilderness. The area is approximately 11,000 acres (45 km^{2}); it was created in 2005 by the Adirondack Park Agency by classifying Round Lake as wilderness, and reclassifying of portions of the Horseshoe Lake Wild Forest and the Hitchens Pond Primitive Area to wilderness status.

There are eleven designated primitive campsites on Round Lake, created in 2007. In addition to Round Lake, the area includes a stretch of the Bog River Flow, Hitchens Pond, Trout Pond and several smaller ponds.

== See also ==
- List of Wilderness Areas in the Adirondack Park
