= Grassy Pond =

Grassy Pond may refer to:

- Grassy Pond (Five Ponds, New York), a small lake north-northwest of Little Rapids in Herkimer County, New York
- Grassy Pond (Oswegatchie SE, New York), a small lake north of Stillwater in Herkimer County, New York
