= Lows Lake =

Lows Lake can refer to the following lakes in the United States:

- Lows Lake (Minnesota), a lake in Crow Wing County, Minnesota
- Lows Lake (New York), a reservoir in St. Lawrence County
