= Little Tupper Lake =

- Location within New York Little Tupper Lake (the United States)
- Location: Hamilton County, New York, United States
- Coordinates: 44°02′26″N 74°36′24″W
- Type: Lake
- Primary outflows: Round Lake
- Basin countries: United States
- Surface area: 2,287 acres (9.26 km^{2})
- Max. depth: 35 feet (11 m)
- Shore length^{1}: 16.8 miles (27.0 km)
- Surface elevation: 1,719 feet (524 m)
- Islands: 14; Short Island
- Settlements: Whitney Headquarters, New York
- ^{1} Shore length is not a well-defined measure.

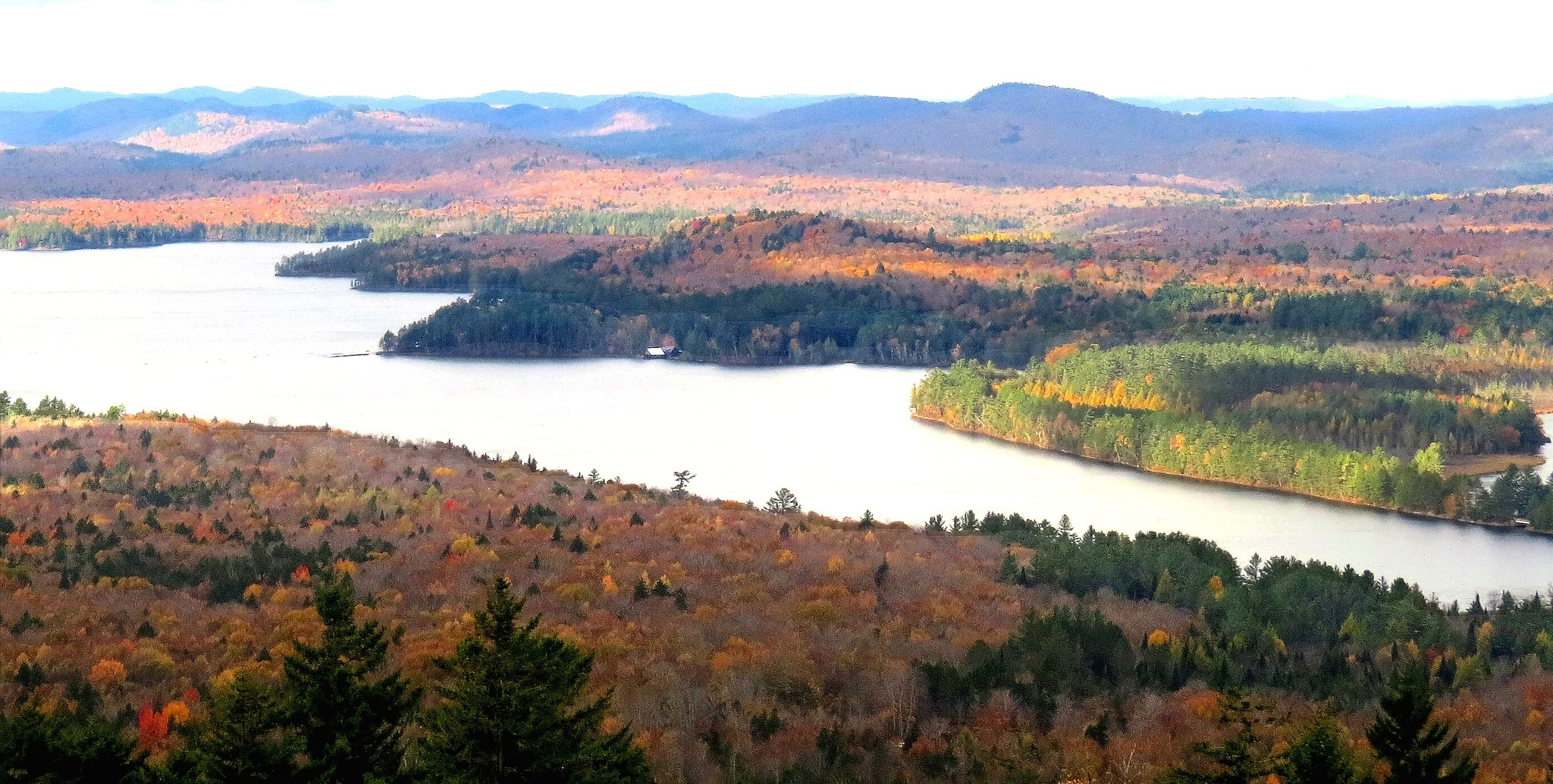

Little Tupper Lake is a 2,300-acre lake located in the town of Long Lake, Hamilton County, New York by Whitney Headquarters, New York. It is located in the 19,500-acre William C. Whitney Wilderness Area.

Of the 100 largest lakes in the park, it is one of only five which are free of motorboats, jetskis, and floatplanes, including Lows, Lake Lila, Round, and Saint Regis Pond.

Fish species present in the lake are bass and sunfish; until 2000 it was stocked with a heritage species of brook trout. There is hand launch available at Whitney Headquarters.
