= Big Deer Pond =

Lake in Hamilton County, New York, U.S.

- Lost Pond
- Location within New York
- Location: Hamilton County, New York, U.S.
- Coordinates: 44.068576°N 74.838709°W
- Type: Lake

Big Deer Pond in Hamilton County, New York is located approximately 1.5 west of Lows Lake in the Five Ponds Wilderness Area and the Adirondacks "Bob Marshall Wilderness" area (there is another in Montana). It serves as a 1/2 mile water-portage between Lows Lake and the upper Oswegatchie River. The portage is a total of 3.5 miles through blowdown of virgin timber. Big Deer Pond is noted for being a large shallow pond with numerous bog plant life. It was initially named Lost Pond by surveyor Verplanck Colvin before being rediscovered by conservationist Bob Marshall (wilderness activist) after the turn of the 20th century.

== Philo Scott ==
Big Deer Pond was the home of Philo Scott, 1841–1911; Adirondack Mountains Region (N.Y.) History 19th century "The Hermit" of Big Deer Pond (or Lost Pond) near Cranberry Lake. Scott was a boyhood neighbor and lifelong friend of J. Henry Rushton (canoe designer) and Reuben Wood (professional fly-dresser). Scott was a legendary Adirondack guide, trapper and the model for the title character in Irving Bacheller novel, Silas Strong, Emperor of the Woods (1906). Bacheller also dedicated the poem, Him and Me, to Scott. Scott registered two patents one for a Railroad Switch and one for an excavation tool.

Scott Philo's one room log cabin was later moved during the winter through the dense woods to Chair Rock on the south end of Cranberry Lake. It was used as the dining room for the historic Wildcliff Lodge (formerly known as "Hoppie's" and then "Verns") and still sits unoccupied as of 2008. A committee of home owners in Chair Rock was organized to purchase Wildcliff as a means to eliminate the perceived noise and visitors to the area. Wildcliff now sits in disarray with no intent to repair or rejuvenate the historic property.
