= Oswegatchie River =

River in northern New York state, US

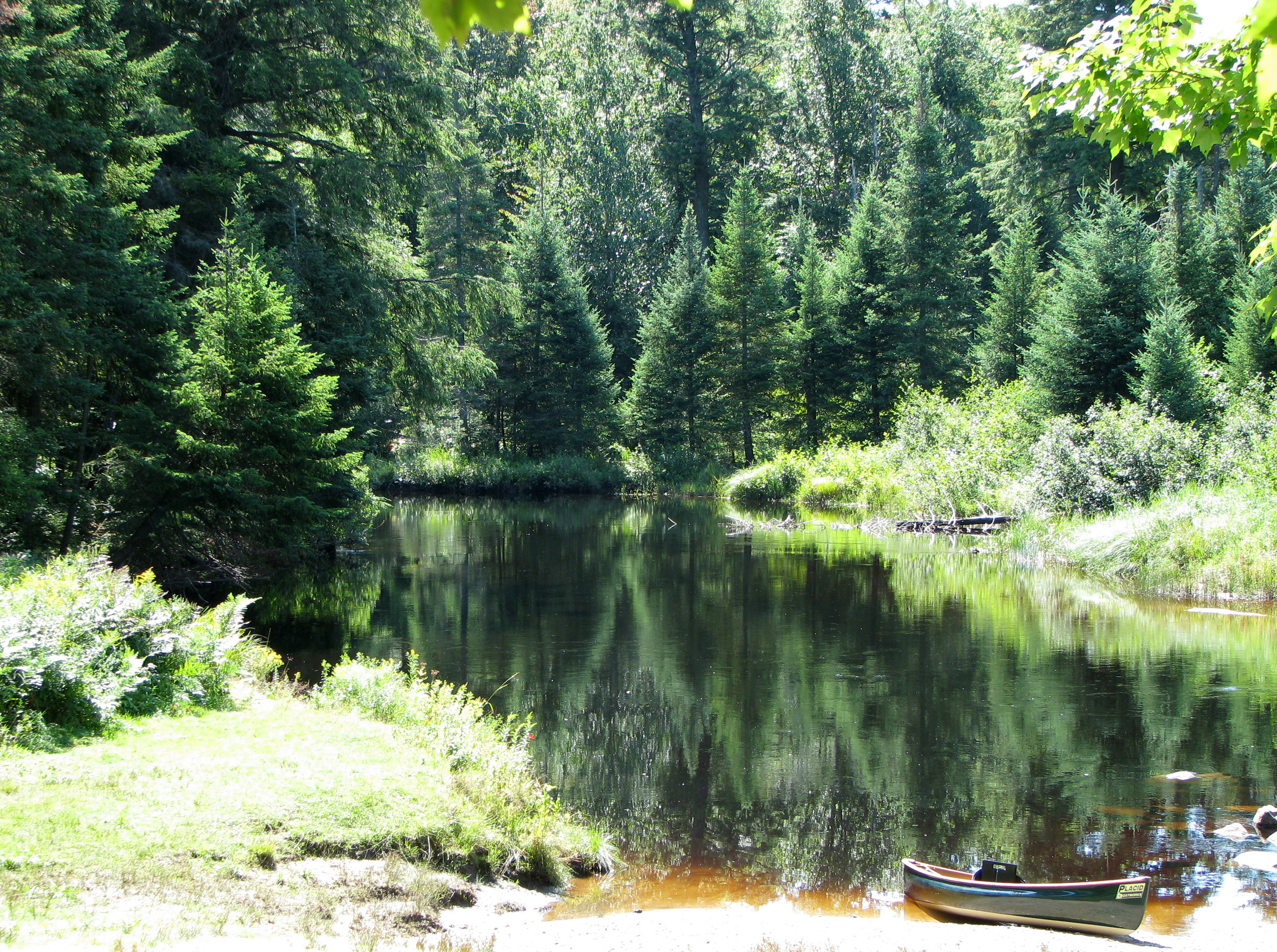
- Oswegatchie River access on Inlet Road

- Location of the mouth Oswegatchie River (the United States)
- Native name: Kaniatarahòn:tsi (Mohawk)

Location
- Country: United States
- State: New York
- Region: Adirondack Mountains
- Counties: St. Lawrence, Jefferson, Herkimer, Hamilton

Physical characteristics
- Source
  - coordinates: 44°01′13″N 74°49′26″W
- Mouth: Saint Lawrence River
  - location: Ogdensburg
  - coordinates: 44°41′45″N 75°29′51″W
  - elevation: 243 ft (74 m)
- Length: 137 mi (220 km)
- Basin size: 1,592 sq mi (4,120 km^{2})

Basin features
- Tributaries
  - left: West Branch Oswegatchie River, Black Lake

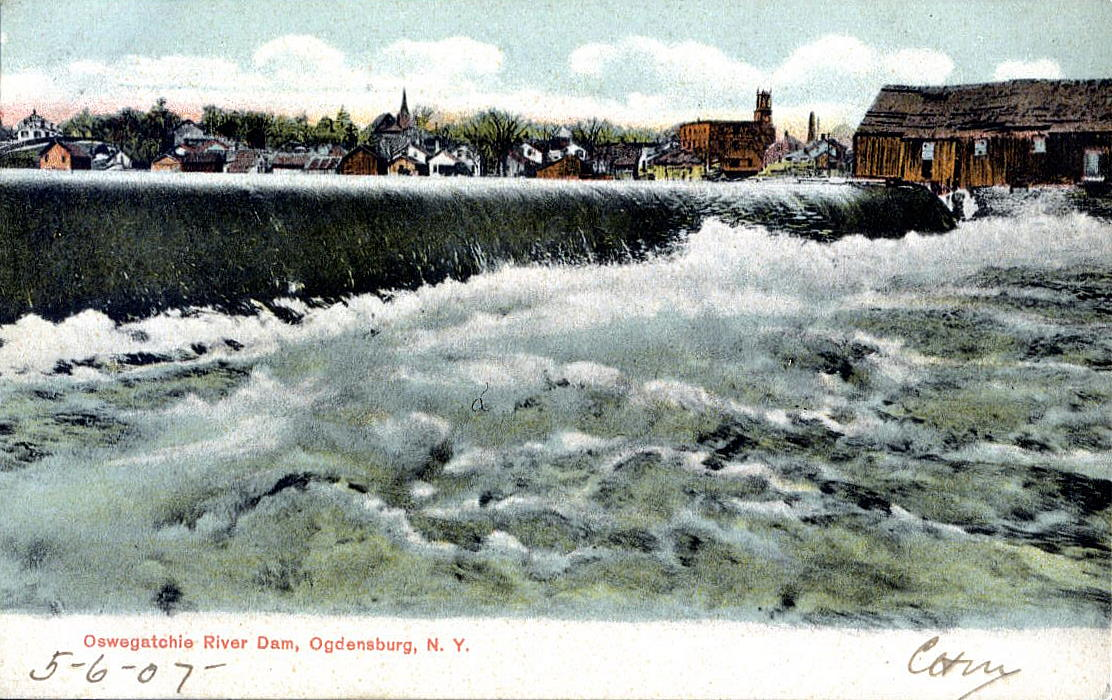
Oswegatchie River Dam, Ogdensburg, from a 1907 postcard

The Oswegatchie River is a 137-mile-long (220 km) river in northern New York that flows from the Adirondack Mountains north to the Saint Lawrence River. The Oswegatchie River begins at Partlow Lake in Hamilton County, New York. The river continues through Cranberry Lake which was 'doubled in size' through construction of a dam in the late 1860s. The river continues from the dam to Gouverneur, to near Talcville in St. Lawrence County, where it joins the West Branch. Much of it is within Adirondack State Park. The city of Ogdensburg developed at the mouth of the river at its confluence with the St. Lawrence.

== History ==
The mouth of the Oswegatchie River at the St. Lawrence River, was the site of a Jesuit mission, Fort de La Présentation, founded in 1749. Also a fur trading post, the village had 3,000 Onondaga by the 1750s, most of whom converted to Catholicism. They came to be known as the Oswegatchie; because of their converted status they were considered to be somewhat separate from the traditional Six Nations of the Iroquois. Oswegatchie may be Iroquois for "going or coming around a hill". William Bright says the name may come from the Onondaga word /oshewɛ'gaaji'/, meaning "black lumber," containing -shewɛ'gar-, "lumber", and -ji-, "be black". The Oswegatchie were considered by the British as one of the Seven Nations of Canada.

== Branches ==
The river is composed of the main branch and two branches named West and Middle, in addition to major inflow from various tributaries before and after their confluences. All of the branches begin in the Five Ponds Wilderness, with the East Branch Oswegatchie beginning at Partlow Lake. One of its branches, the Robinson River, begins at Crooked Lake.

The Middle Branch headwaters are Willy's and Walker lakes with one of its headwaters, an unnamed pond, separated from Crooked Lake by approximately fifty feet of land.

The West Branch Oswegatchie has its headwaters at Buck and Hog ponds, which are separated from a smaller branch of the Middle Branch Oswegatchie by a short distance of land. Major western tributaries, including the Indian River via Black Lake, originate in areas west of the Wilderness Park and include an extended watershed covering an appreciable portion of the area west of the main stem.

=== Middle branch ===
The Middle Branch Oswegatchie River mostly consists of shallow and fast-moving waters with only two or three slow-moving sections favorable for canoeists. These include Alder Bed Flow and another still-water section known locally as Moynehan Flow. The latter begins in the area where Lower South Pond Outlet runs into the river. Occasionally, experienced kayakers take advantage of high water conditions to ply its waters – generally from the Bear Pond Road, a few miles upstream of Alder Bed Flow, and downstream to another seasonal access road located near Mullins Flow. However, because they are seasonal roads and the area is so remote – this part of the river is seldom used. Brook trout exist as the primary sport-fish for the entire length of Middle Branch Oswegatchie. Chubs & bullheads are also present in its waters.

=== West branch ===
The West Branch Oswegatchie River is slower-moving than the Middle Branch. But the still waters such as Long Pond, Mud Pond and Long Level, are separated by hard-to-traverse rapids and/or waterfalls. The Branch's far-upstream sections consist of small and narrow feeder streams, which are generally not favorable to canoeists due to fallen logs and overhanging alders. During the Great Depression, New York State purchased deeded fishing rights for the public on most of the river. The Civilian Conservation Corps created a public trail from where the outlet of Mud Pond crosses the Long Pond Road, downstream to the Jerden Falls Road. Today, no sign of the trail has survived, but the deeded fishing rights for the public remain, despite new landowners in some locations. Brook trout are the main sport-fish. Shiners, sunfish, suckers, chubs, minnows, bullheads and other fish may also be found in its waters.

=== Confluence ===
The Middle Branch Oswegatchie River unites with the West Branch Oswegatchie River near the village of Harrisville, in Lewis County. The river continues downstream as the West Branch Oswegatchie River, until it unites with the Oswegatchie River at a point a short distance west of the village of Talcville. From that point, it is known as "the Oswegatchie," as it flows northerly to its terminus with the St. Lawrence River near Ogdensburg, New York. The last major tributary to the system is flow from the Indian River system after Black Lake. The lower part of the main stem of the river, between Gouverneur and Ogdensburg, is slow-moving, with some rapids that can be handled by experienced canoeists. Important fish species include smallmouth bass, northern pike, musky, channel catfish, walleyes, red-finned mullet, and common carp.

== Tributaries ==
Right

Glasby Creek
Skate Creek
Tooley Pond Outlet
Skate Creek
Welch Creek
Stammer Creek
Robinson Creek
White Creek
Indian Creek
Anderson Creek
Indian Creek
Lisbon Creek

Left

Robinson River
Wolf Pond Outlet
Buck Brook
Peavine Creek
Thomas Brook
Little River
West Branch Oswegatchie River
Turnpike Creek
Matoon Creek
Malterna Creek
Vrooman Creek
Bonney Creek
Beaver Creek
Black Lake

== Navigation ==
The middle section of the Oswegatchie, and the East Branch Oswegatchie between Gouverneur (village) and Cranberry Lake, are partially navigable by experienced canoeists. A two-mile section from southern Cranberry Lake to Inlet is unnavigable. From Inlet, the upper Oswegatchie is one of the wildest canoeable rivers in the Adirondacks.

The area is rich in history from logging days to the present. The upper river provides access to some of the most remote parts of Adirondack Park. Near the southern edge of St. Lawrence County, it goes over High Falls on the Oswegatchie River. There is a 3.5-mile (5.6 km) portage at the old historic "Beaverdam" by which canoeists can hike to continue their paddling at Lows Lake and the Bog River. These are all located in the Five Ponds Wilderness Area.

== See also ==
- List of New York rivers
- List of Wilderness Areas in the Adirondack Park
- SUNY-ESF Ranger School

== Photo gallery ==
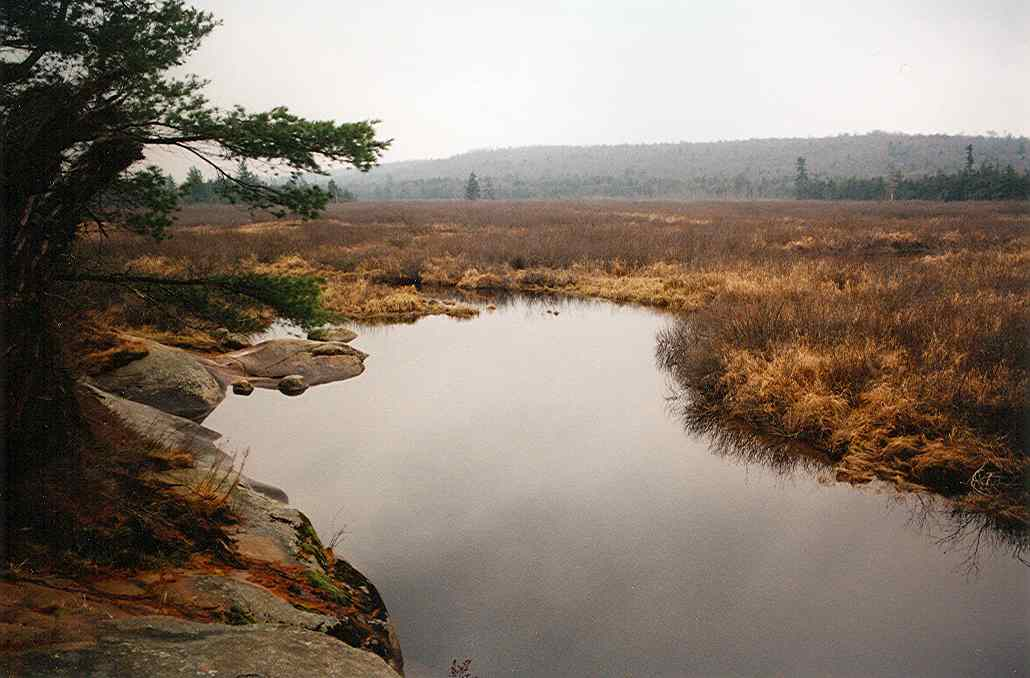
The upper Oswegatchie R. near High Rock, in December

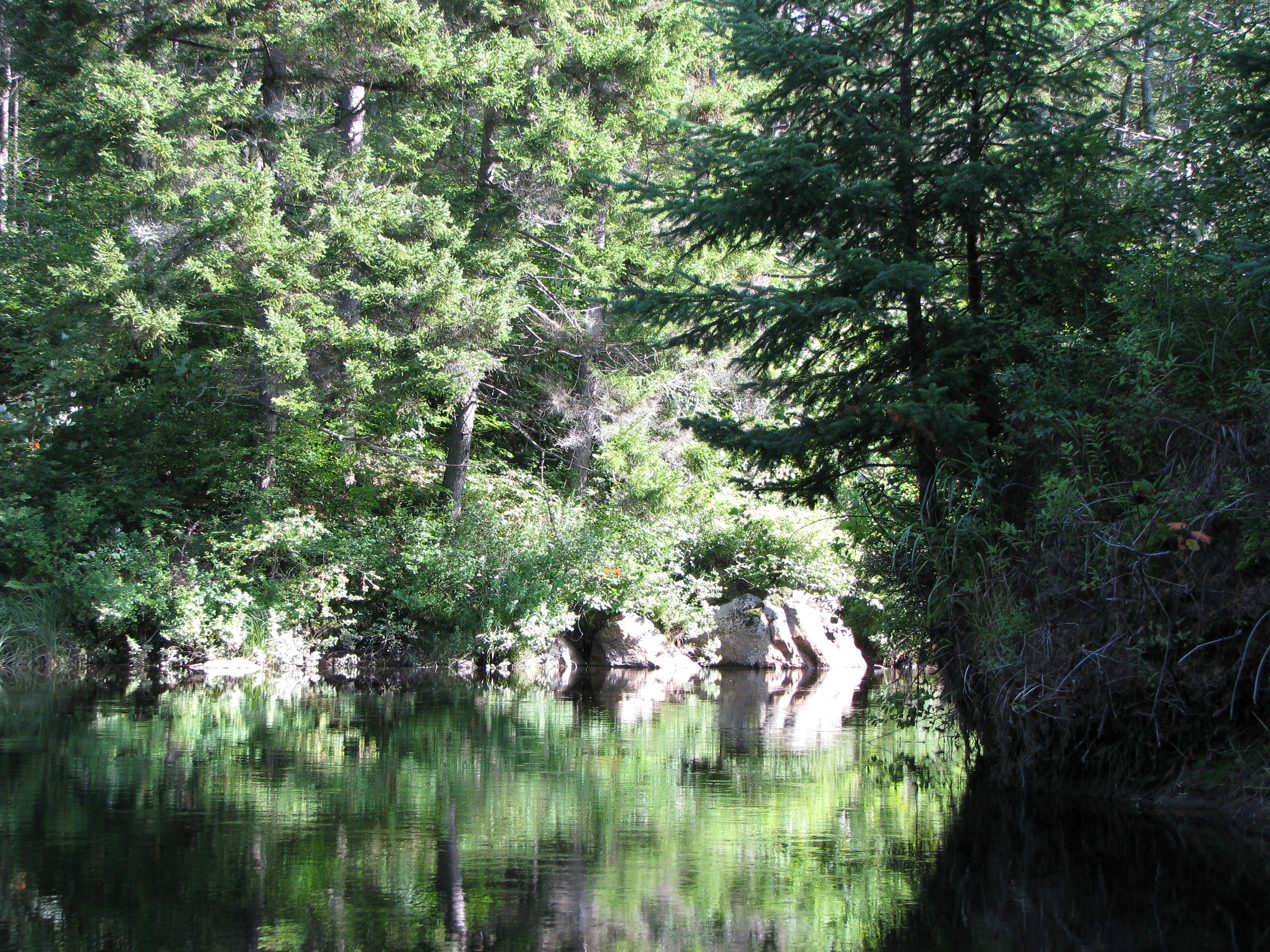
Oswegatchie River, August, 2008

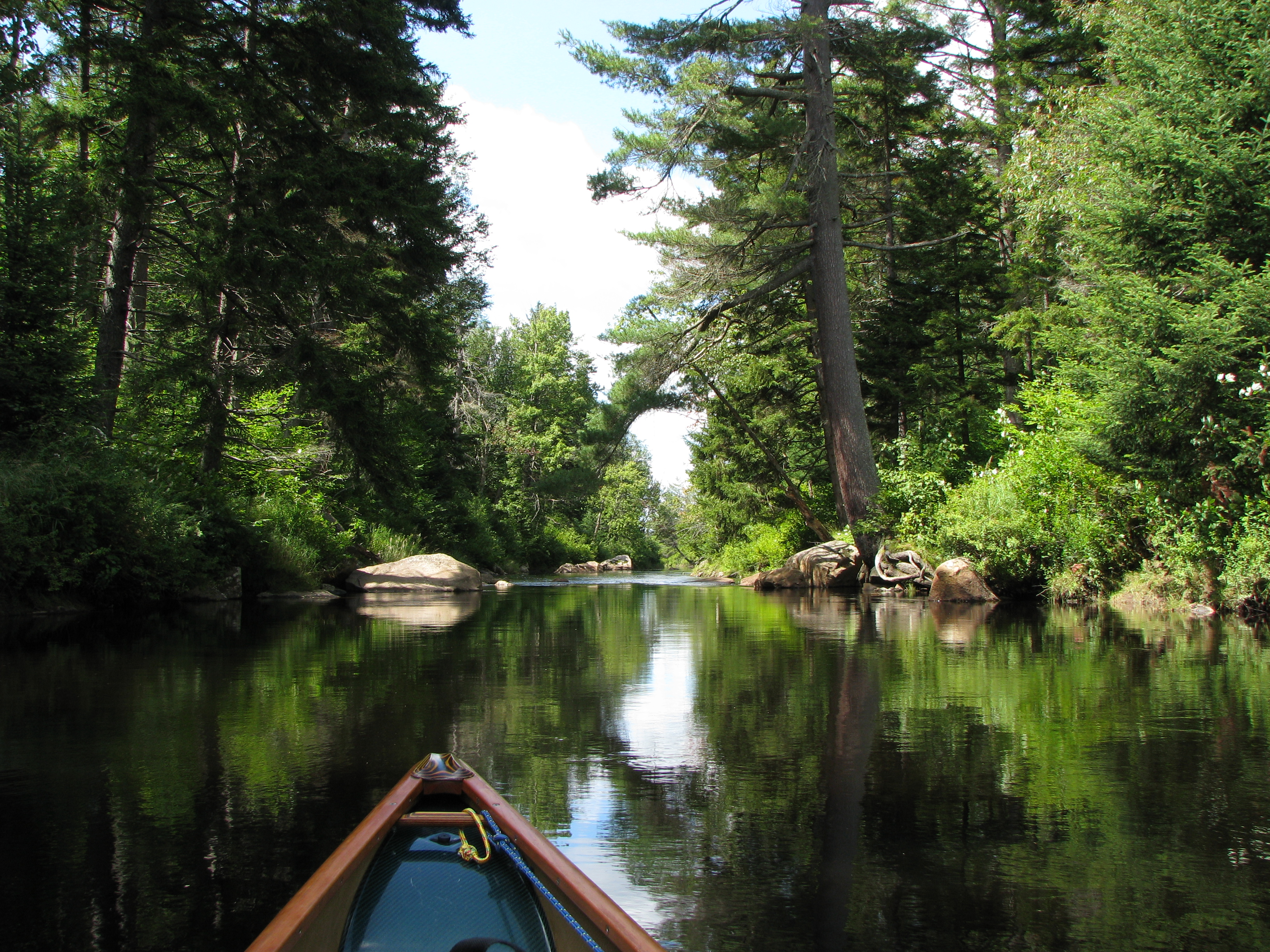
Rapids near site 28

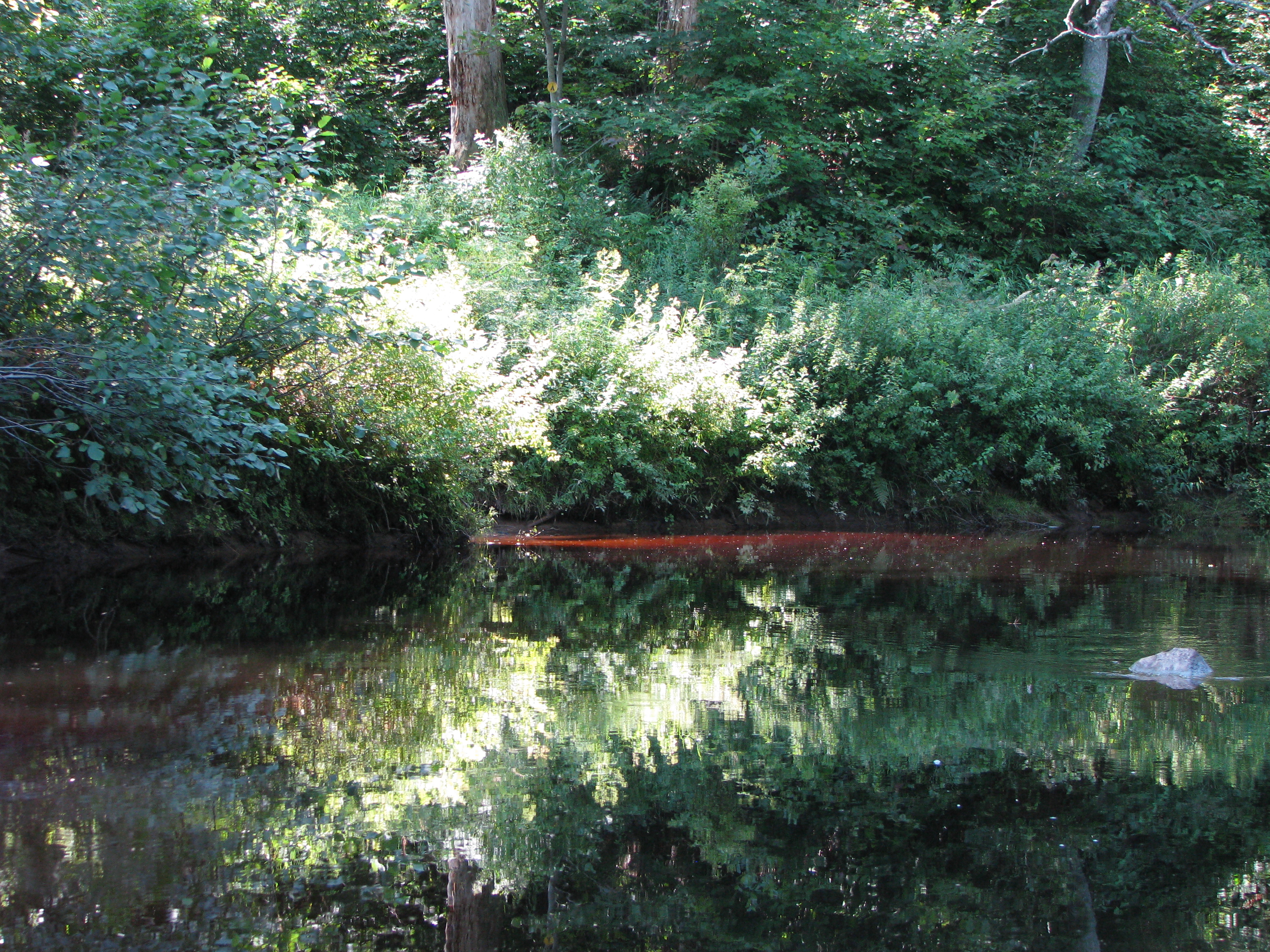
Oswegatchie water is tannin-stained
