= High Falls =

High Falls or Highfalls may refer to:

== United States ==
=== Minnesota ===
- The High Falls of the Baptism River in Tettegouche State Park, Minnesota
- The High Falls of the Pigeon River in Grand Portage State Park, Minnesota

=== New York ===
- High Falls (Rochester, New York), a waterfall on the Genesee River in Rochester
- High Falls, New York, a hamlet
- High Falls Brewing Company, the former name of Genesee Brewing Company, a brewery in Rochester
- High Falls on the Oswegatchie River, a waterfall on the Oswegatchie River

=== Pennsylvania ===
- The High Falls of the Falls Creek (Delaware River tributary) in Ringing Rocks Park, Bucks County, Pennsylvania

=== Other ===
- Highfalls, Alabama, an unincorporated community
- High Falls State Park in Georgia
- High Falls (DuPont State Forest), a waterfall on the Little River in North Carolina

== Canada ==
- High Falls, Ontario, a ghost town near Walden
