= Bog River =

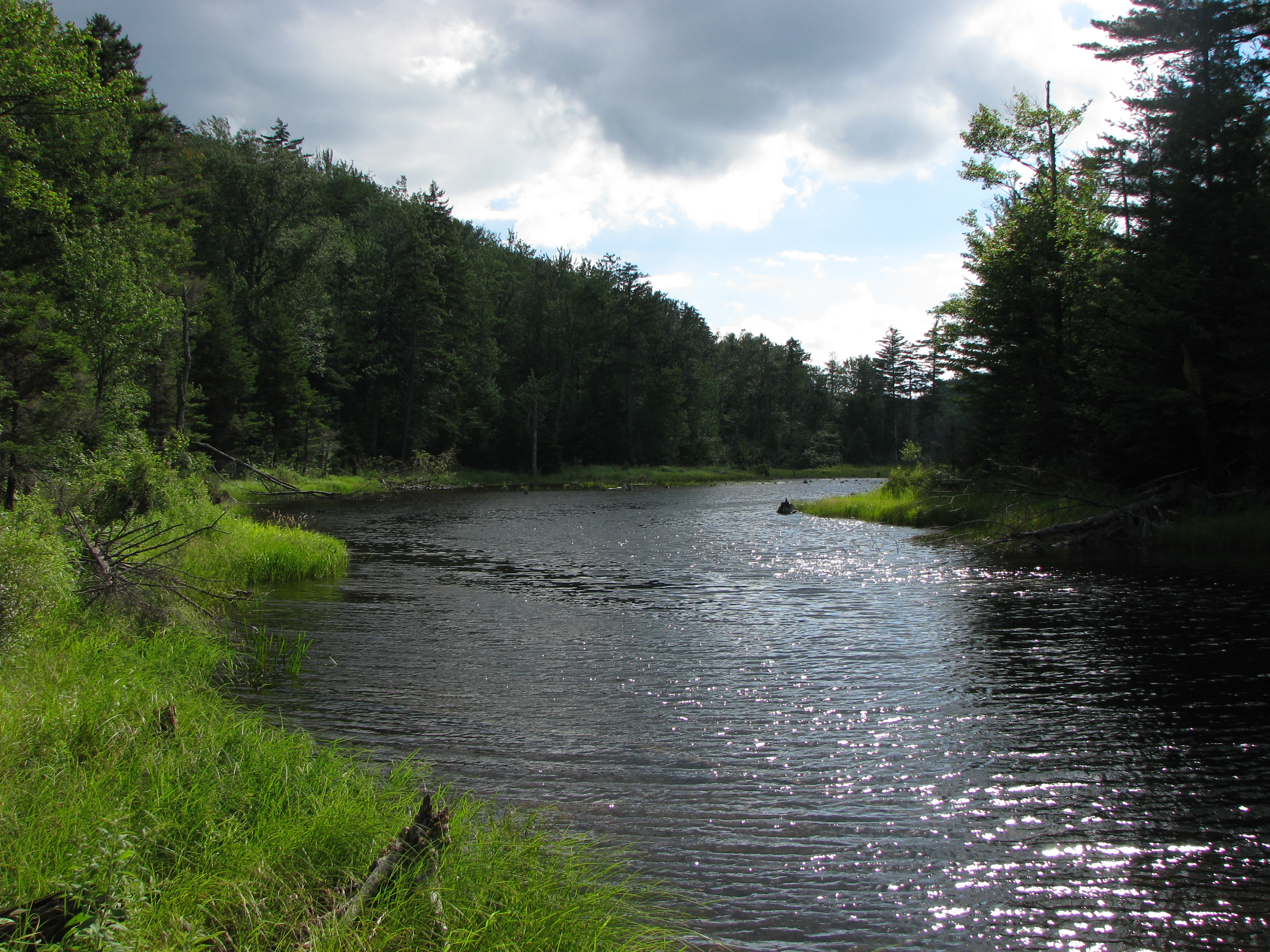

Location
- Country: United States
- State: New York

Physical characteristics
- Mouth: Tupper Lake
  - location: Tupper Lake, New York
  - coordinates: 44°07′44″N 74°32′42″W
  - elevation: 1,554 ft (474 m)
- Length: 18 mi (29 km)
- Basin size: 132 mi^{2} (340 km^{2})

The Bog River, also called the Bog River Flow is a 18-mile (29 km) river that originates near the sources of the Oswegatchie River, in Hamilton County, New York in the Adirondacks, and flows through Lows Lake and Hitchens Pond, ending at the Bog River Falls at the entrance to Tupper Lake. For much of its length it is flat water owing to two hydroelectric dams built by Abbot Augustus Low early in the 20th century. There are forty established campsites. The stretch from Tupper Lake to Hitchens pond has been designated as a Scenic River by the State of New York. The river is part of the Five Ponds and the Round Lake Wilderness Areas.

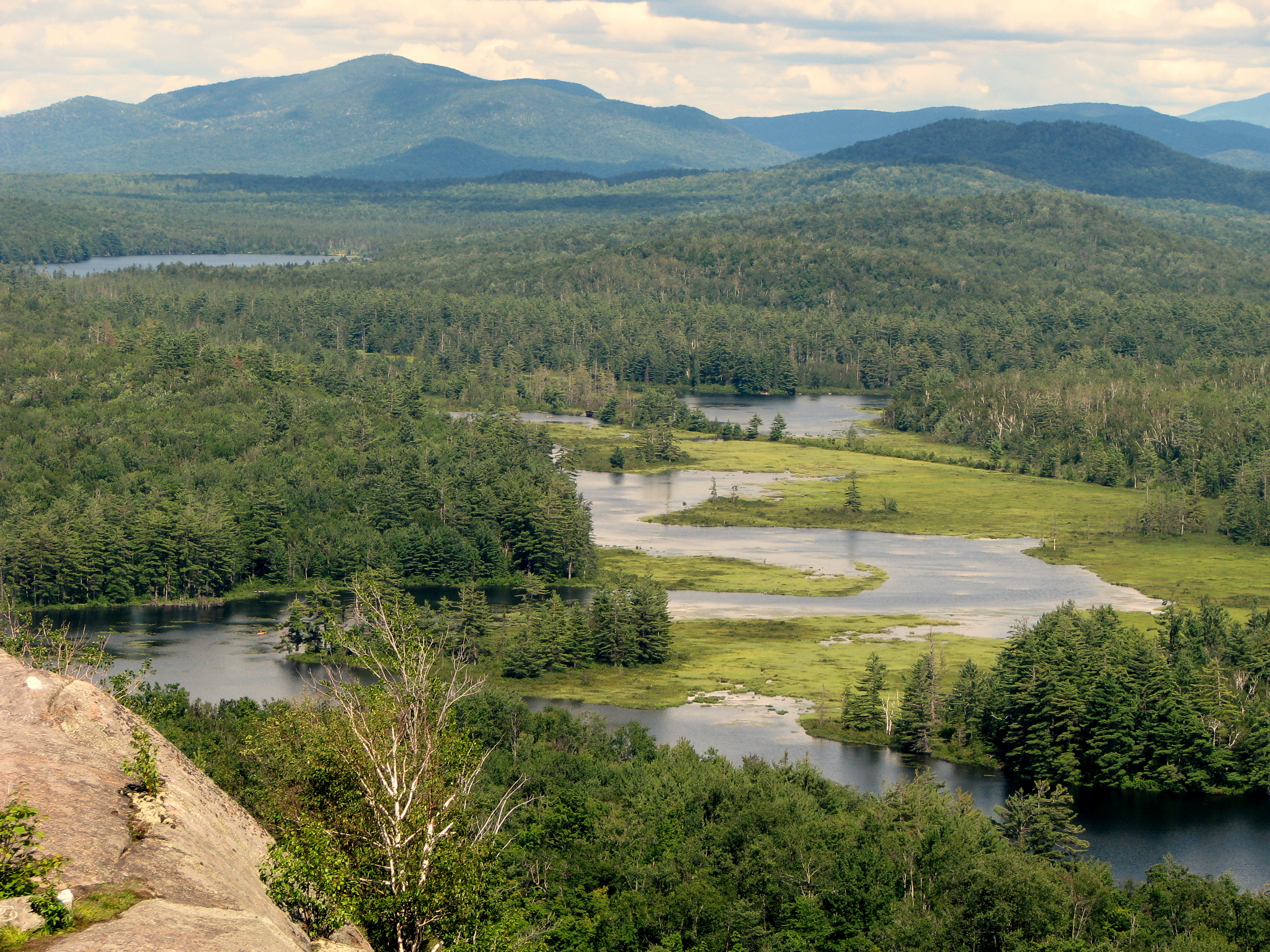
Bog River Flow from Low's Ridge

== See also ==
- List of New York rivers
- List of Wilderness Areas in the Adirondack Park
