= High Falls on the Oswegatchie River =

High Falls
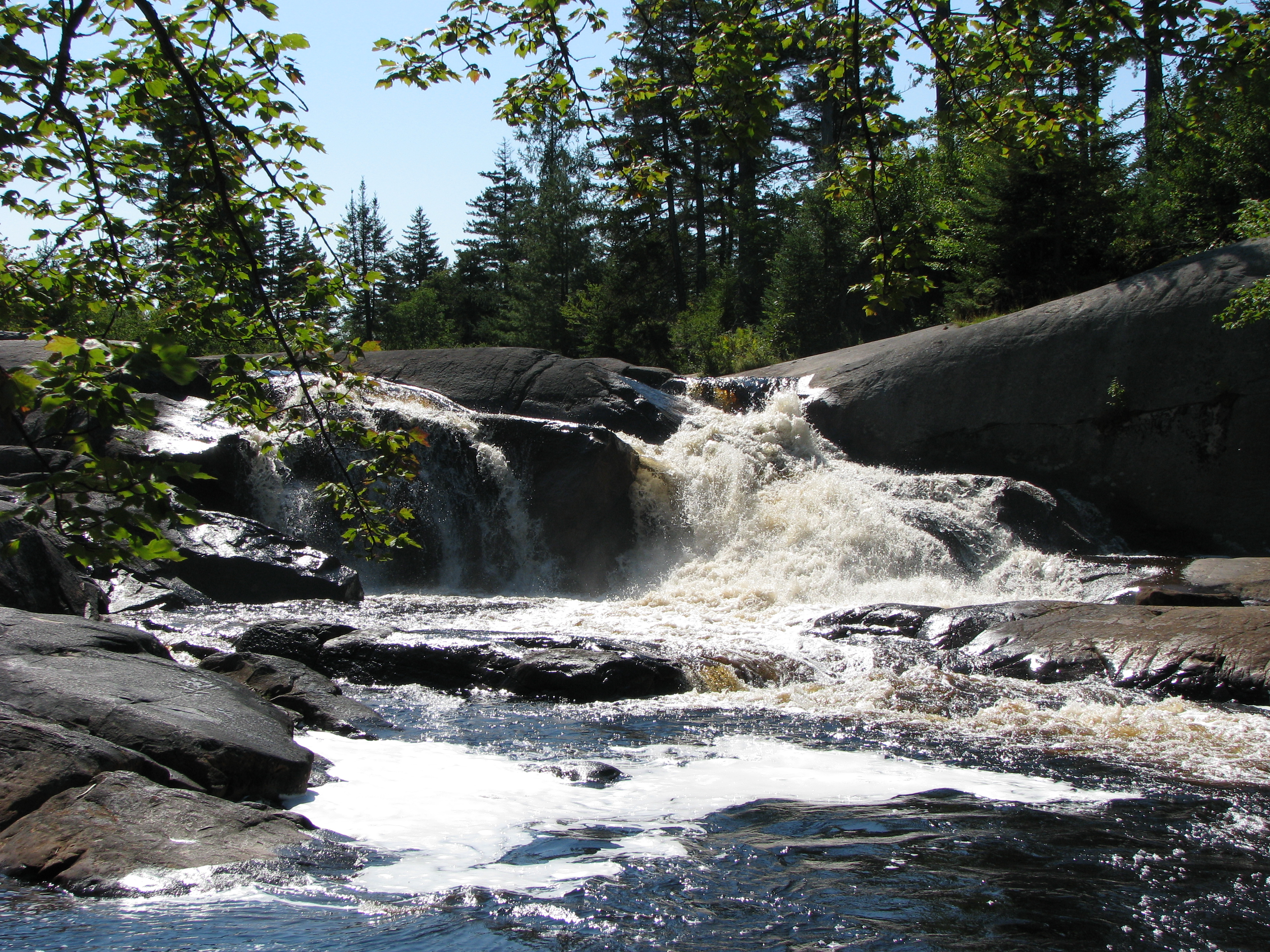
- High Falls on the Oswegatchie
- Interactive map of High Falls
- Location: Adirondack Park, Fine, New York, United States
- Coordinates: 44°04′07″N 74°54′37″W
- Elevation: 1,601 ft (488 m)
- Total height: 15 feet (4.6 m)

High Falls is a small but picturesque waterfall on the upper Oswegatchie River in the Five Ponds Wilderness. It is located in the town of Fine, in a remote part of Adirondack State Park in St. Lawrence County. The falls drops about 20 feet (6.1 m). Access is by canoe or by maintained hiking trails. The closest public road, near Wanakena, is almost six miles (circa 9 km) to the north. Trail access is by a short spur from the High Falls Loop Trail. The most direct canoe access is by way of the Oswegatchie River from the Oswegatchie River Inlet on Inlet Road. The waterfall has been designated a scenic special interest area in the New York State Land Master Plan.

== History ==
At the falls the Oswegatchie flows northwest over glaciated granite gneiss bedrock. They are surrounded by white pine forest, somewhat more open than one might expect in an area characterized as old growth forest. However windstorms in 1950 and in 1995 devastated this part of the Five Ponds Wilderness. The region has been logged and remnants from that era may be found nearby. A logging railroad once ran between Wanakena and High Falls. The Rich Lumber Company built the standard gauge railroad along the Oswegatchie River about 1902 and operated it until 1912. That part of the Five Ponds Wilderness to the south of High Falls still has the largest area of virgin forest in the US Northeast however. It is also the largest trailless area in New York state.

There is no longer a bridge at High Falls, and a canoe is required to gain access to the region further south. The portage around the waterfall itself is short. The former bridge was the crossing for the long-abandoned middle section of the Red Horse Trail. The original trail ran from Wanakena to the Beaver River, now the Stillwater Reservoir, ten miles (16 km) south of the falls. The Red Horse Trail was one of the oldest Adirondack Mountain Club (ADK) hiking trails in Adirondack Park, dating back to the 1920s. The five-and-a-half mile (9 km) section running north from Big Burnt Lake / Trout Pond is all that remains of that trail. The Red Horse Trail intersected the old Albany Road, known as the Old Military Road, a half-mile south of High Falls. The Old Military Road was built between 1812 and 1815, following a much older Indian trail.

== Gallery ==
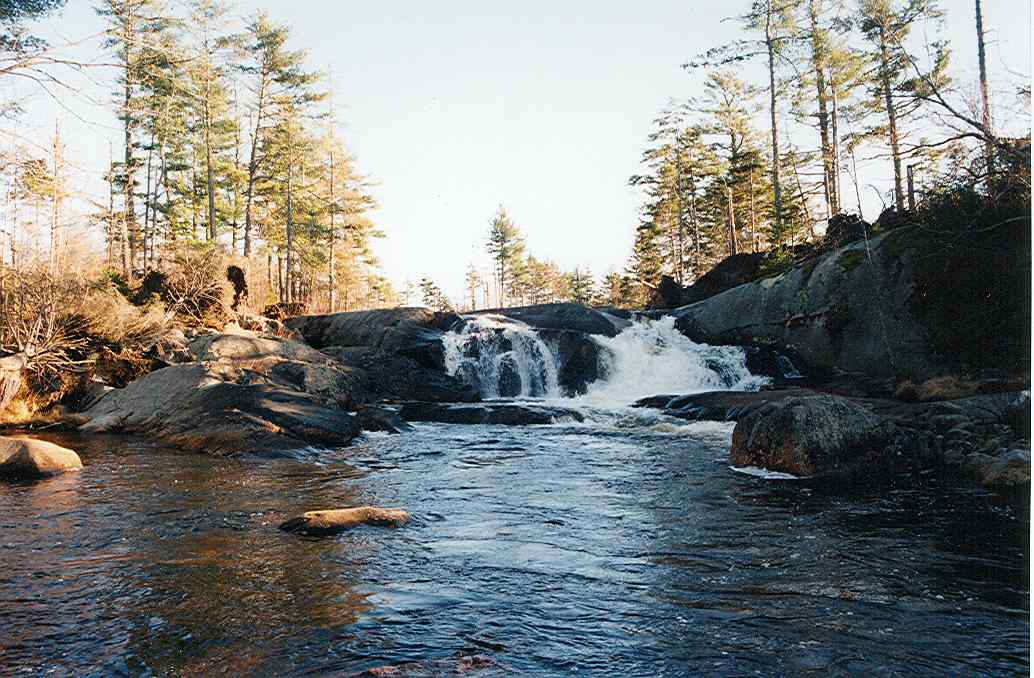
High Falls, December 1998

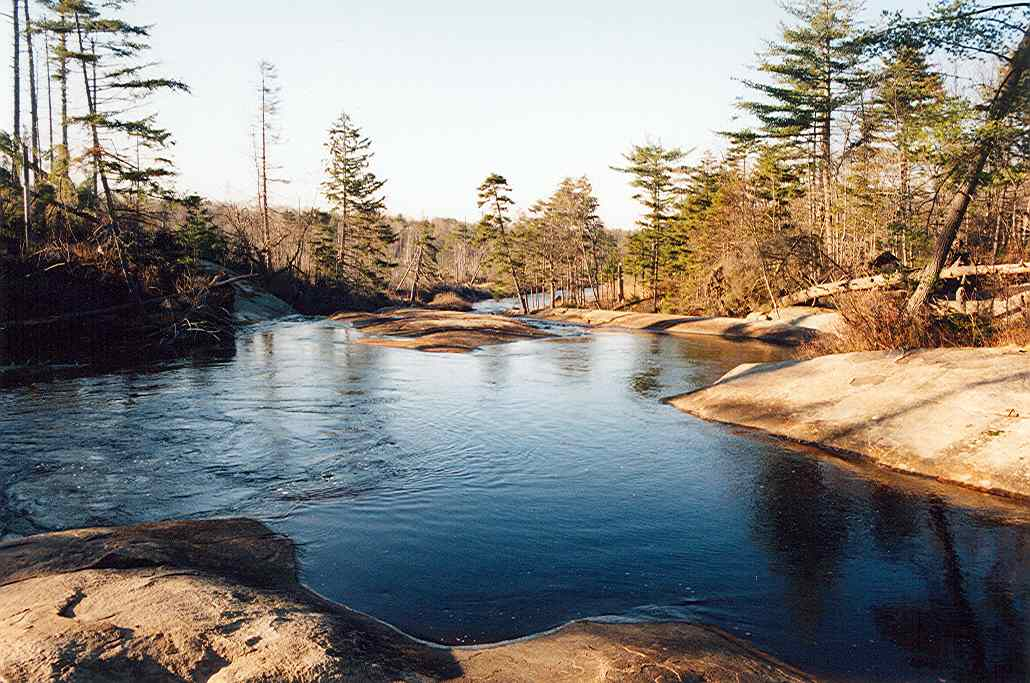
Above the High Falls on the Oswegatchie

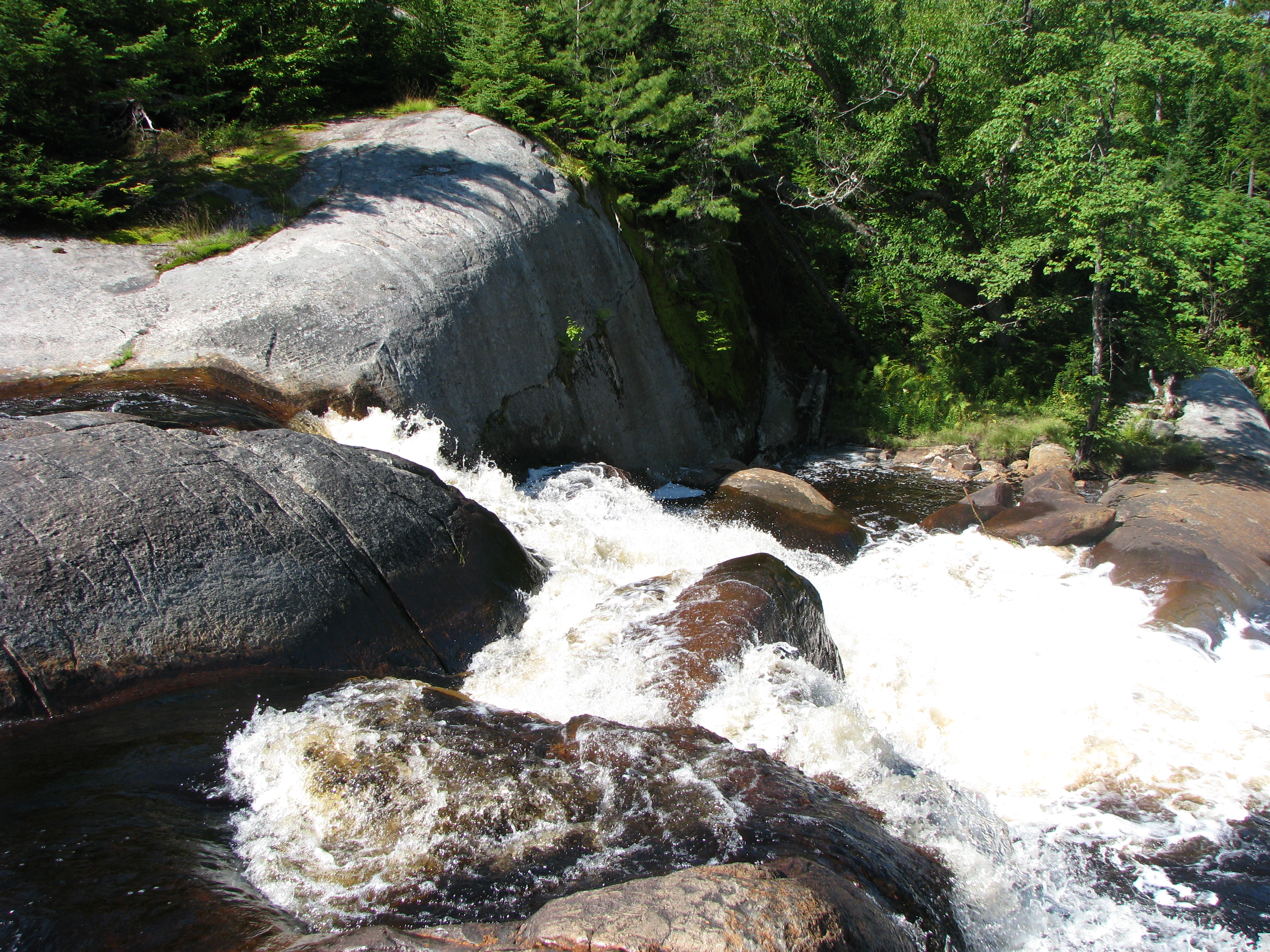
August, 2008

== Maps ==
USGS 7.5' Five Ponds 1:24,000

== See also ==
- List of New York rivers
- List of Wilderness Areas in the Adirondack Park
