= Grassy Pond (Oswegatchie SE, New York) =

- Location of Grassy Pond within New York
- Location: Herkimer County, New York
- Coordinates: 44°00′08″N 75°02′33″W
- Type: Lake
- Basin countries: United States
- Surface area: 21 acres (8.5 ha)
- Surface elevation: 1,768 ft (539 m)
- Settlements: Stillwater

Grassy Pond is a small lake north of Stillwater in Herkimer County, New York. It drains south via an unnamed creek which flows into the Middle Branch Oswegatchie River.

== See also ==
- List of lakes in New York
