= Cranberry Lake =

Cranberry Lake (New York)
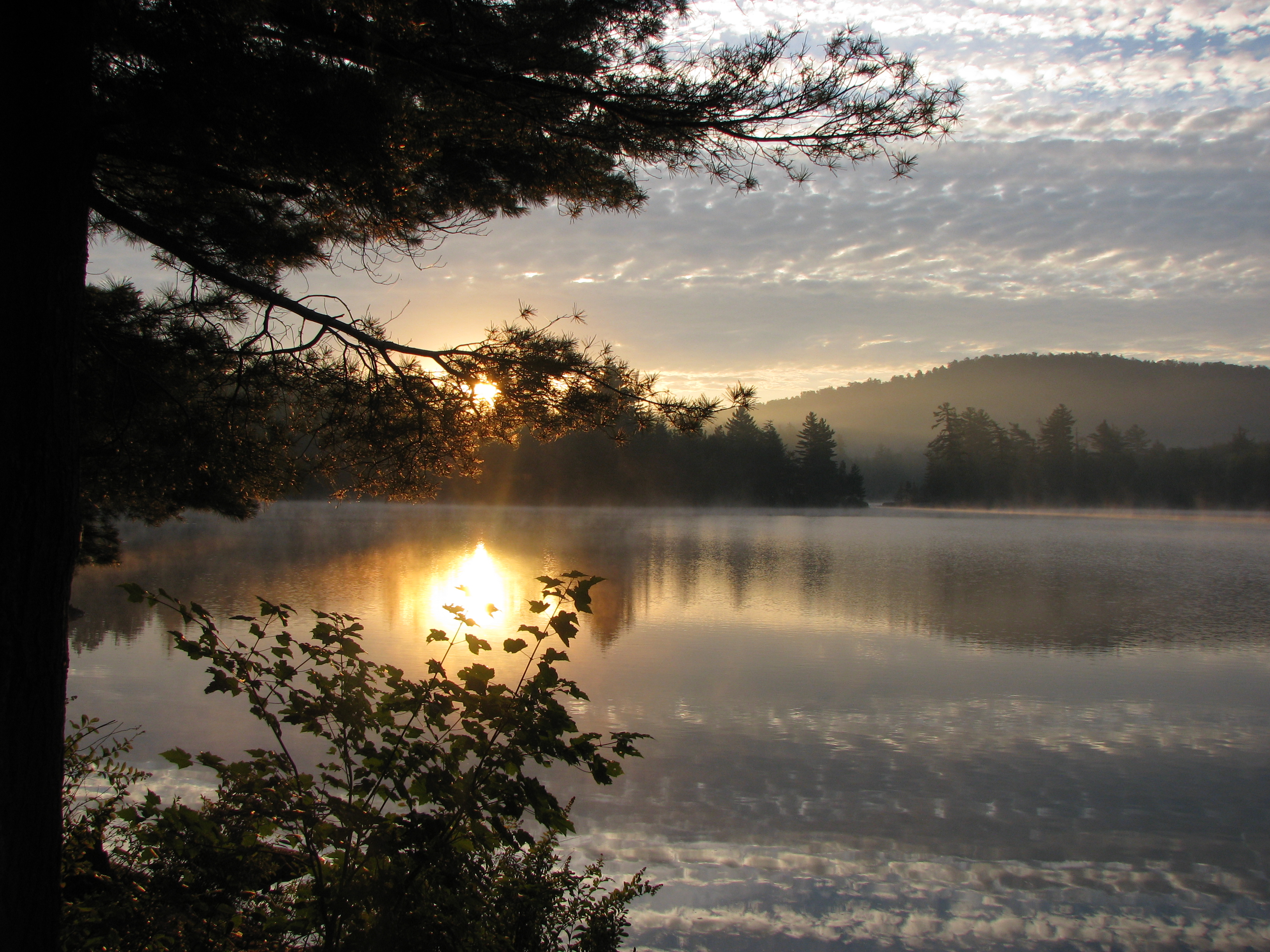
- Black Duck Hole, Cranberry Lake

- Location within New York Cranberry Lake (New York) (the United States)
- Location: St. Lawrence County, New York, US
- Coordinates: 44°07′32″N 74°53′07″W, 44°10′22″N 74°49′31″W, 44°07′06″N 74°53′24″W
- Type: Reservoir
- Primary inflows: Oswegatchie River (east branch)
- Primary outflows: Oswegatchie River (east branch)
- Basin countries: United States
- Max. length: 8.6 mi (13.8 km)
- Max. width: 3.8 mi (6.1 km)
- Surface area: 6,975 acres (2,823 ha)
- Average depth: 6 ft (1.8 m)
- Max. depth: 38 ft (12 m)
- Shore length^{1}: 55 mi (89 km)
- Surface elevation: 1,480 ft (450 m)
- Islands: 38; Joe Indian Island, Buck Island
- Settlements: Cranberry Lake, Wanakena
- ^{1} Shore length is not a well-defined measure.

Cranberry Lake is on the east branch of the Oswegatchie River in the Adirondack Park in New York in the United States. It is the third largest lake in the Adirondack Park (after Lake George and the Great Sacandaga Lake). About 75 percent of the shoreline is owned by the State of New York. The 118,000-acre (480 km^{2}) Five Ponds Wilderness Area abuts its south shore, and the Cranberry Lake Wild Forest covers much of its remaining shoreline.

== Location ==
Most of the lake is in the eastern end of the Town of Clifton, but a small part of the east side of the lake is in the Town of Colton and a small part of the west side of the lake is in the Town of Fine. The lake is entirely in the south part of Saint Lawrence County, New York.

On a north arm of the lake is the community of Cranberry Lake. On a western arm of the lake in the Town of Fine, is the community of Wanakena, the location of the SUNY-ESF Ranger School.

Several islands are within the lake, the largest being Joe Indian Island and Buck Island. The Cranberry Lake Biological Station, also part of State University of New York College of Environmental Science and Forestry (SUNY-ESF), is located on Barber Point.

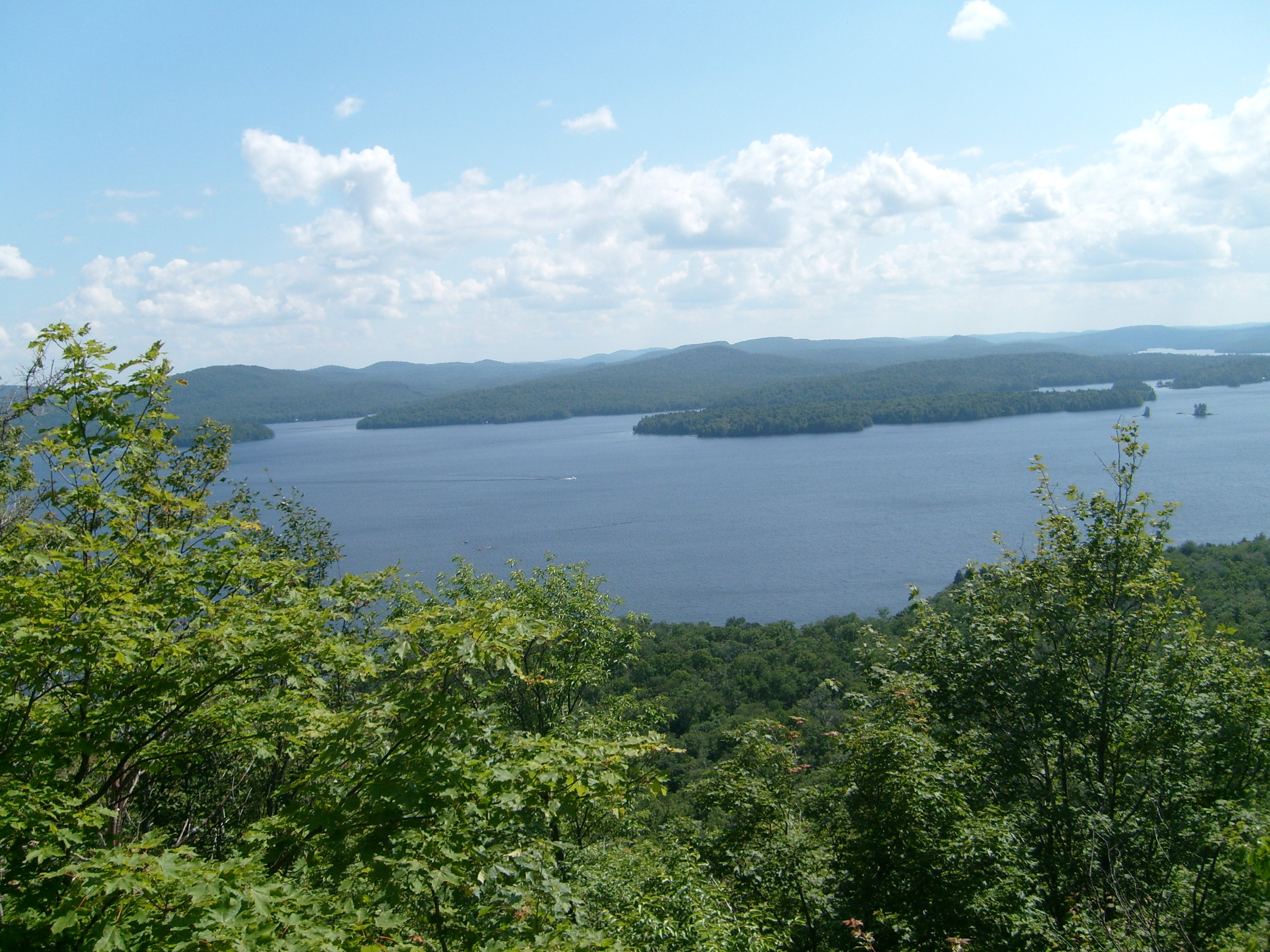
View from Bear Mountain lookout over Cranberry Lake

== Recreation and points of interest ==
A peninsula jutting into the lake from the north contains Bear Mountain and state camping facilities. One end of the Bear Mountain Trail leaves from campsite loop 3. The other end, a trail head with plenty of good parking, is located much closer to the campground entrance. The hike is fairly rigorous, but from start to the top it is only about 1-mile (1.6 km). The lookout spot near the top provides a great view to the south and south west, mainly of Joe Indian and Buck islands.

A fifty mile loop trail named the Cranberry Lake 50 is a popular destination for backpackers and traverses through both the hamlets of Cranberry Lake and Wanakena.

There are several private camps on the lake's southern shore, including an island called Chair Rock Island. A large rock on Barber Point near the Biological Station bears an engraved memorial for the international fly casting champion of the late 1800s, Reuben Wood, designer of the Reub Wood fishing flies.

There is a large camp setting called Wildcliffe Lodge (formerly "Hoppie's" and then "Vern's") that used to have an inn, bar and restaurant. The dining room was the former single room log cabin of Philo Scott, a hermit who married a local resident, Cordelia Stevens of Big Deer Pond, in 1856 and had eight children between 1858 and 1879. Chair Rock Lodge was another popular dining and lodging establishment on the South Shore, but both are now closed.

The Indian Mountain Club was also on the South Shore. "Sports" from downstate New York enjoyed dining, lodging and outdoor pursuits such as hunting, fishing and shooting. A large garden provided fresh vegetables and remnants of this still exist on private property abutting the Five Ponds Wilderness.

- Arnold's Point – a point located near Joe Indian Island
- Barber Island – an island located off Barber Point
- Black Duck Hole – a bay located off the Dead Creek Flow bay
- Brandy Brook Flow – a bay located on the northeast part of the lake; the mouth of Brandy Brook is in this bay
- Bear Mountain Flow – a bay located north of Brandy Brook Flow bay
- Birch Island – an island located off Union Point
- Buck Island – an island located off Coles Point, in the South Bay
- Barber Point – a point located by the inlet of Sucker Brook
- Cranberry Lake 50 – a 50 mile backpacking loop trail around the lake
- Dead Creek Flow – a bay located where the Dead Creek enters the lake
- Elephant Rock – an island located off Arnold's Point
- Eagle Island – an island located off the Bear Mountain peninsula between Union Point and Burnt Rock point
- Flatiron Point – a point located at the mouth of the Oswegatchie River Inlet Flow
- Joe Indian Island – an island located off the Shanty Brook Flow; The largest island on the lake; Joe's Point and Long Point are located on this island
- Matilda Bay – a bay located west of Matilda Island
- Matilda Island – an island located near the outlet of the lak.
- Oswegatchie River Inlet Flow – a bay located where the Oswegatchie River and Skate Creek enter the lake
- South Flow – a bay located south of Buck Island; the Six Mile Creek enters the lake here

== Fishing ==
Fish species present in the lake are smallmouth bass, northern pike, brook trout, rock bass, yellow perch, brown bullhead, sunfish largemouth bass, and brown trout. There is a state owned hard surface ramp on Route 3 by the outlet dam. There is also a state owned car top launch at the Cranberry Lake Campground and one more at the New York State Rangers School in Wanakena, New York.

== History ==
The lake was named for the extensive bogs that it once contained. In 1865, the state authorized the building of a dam on the east branch of the Oswegatchie that doubled the lake's surface area and killed thousands of trees, the stumps of which still remain in some areas. In 1902, the Rich Lumber Company purchased 16,000 acres (65 km^{2}) on the southwestern shore of Cranberry Lake and constructed a lumber mill. Housing for the millworkers was built in part from lumber salvaged from the company's abandoned Pennsylvania lumber operation. There were up to 1,500 workers at the Rich Bros. mill and associated industries.

A logging railroad was constructed connecting Wanakena to the Carthage & Adirondack Railroad at Benson Mines, starting operation in 1903. The railroad allowed tourists easy access to the area. In 1913, a second railroad called the Grasse River Railroad was built by the Emporium Lumber Company, connecting Cranberry Lake to the New York Central Railroad at Childwold Station near Conifer, New York.

The Rich Lumber Co. donated 1,800 acres (7.3 km^{2}) in the vicinity of Cranberry Lake to the New York State Ranger School in 1912. A businessman, Charles Lathrop Pack, donated 1,000 acres (4.0 km^{2}) of what today is the Cranberry Lake Biological Station to the New York State College of Forestry in 1923. Six years later, in 1929, the International Paper Company donated 500 acres (2.0 km^{2}) to the Ranger School. By 1940, the state had purchased most of the remaining lands of the former lumber companies.
