= Cat Mountain =

Mountain in Fujian, China

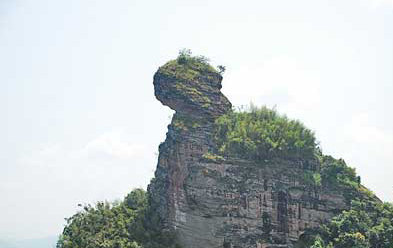

Highest point
- Elevation: 516 m (1,693 ft)
- Coordinates: 26.79809°N 117.02816°E

Geography
- Location within Fujian
- Location: Taining County, Fujian

Cat Mountain (also Mao'er Mountains; Chinese: 猫儿山; pinyin: Māo'ér Shān) is a mountain located in Taining County, Sanming, Fujian in the People's Republic of China. Its elevation is 516 m.
