= Lake Lila =

Lake in Adirondack Park, NY, USA

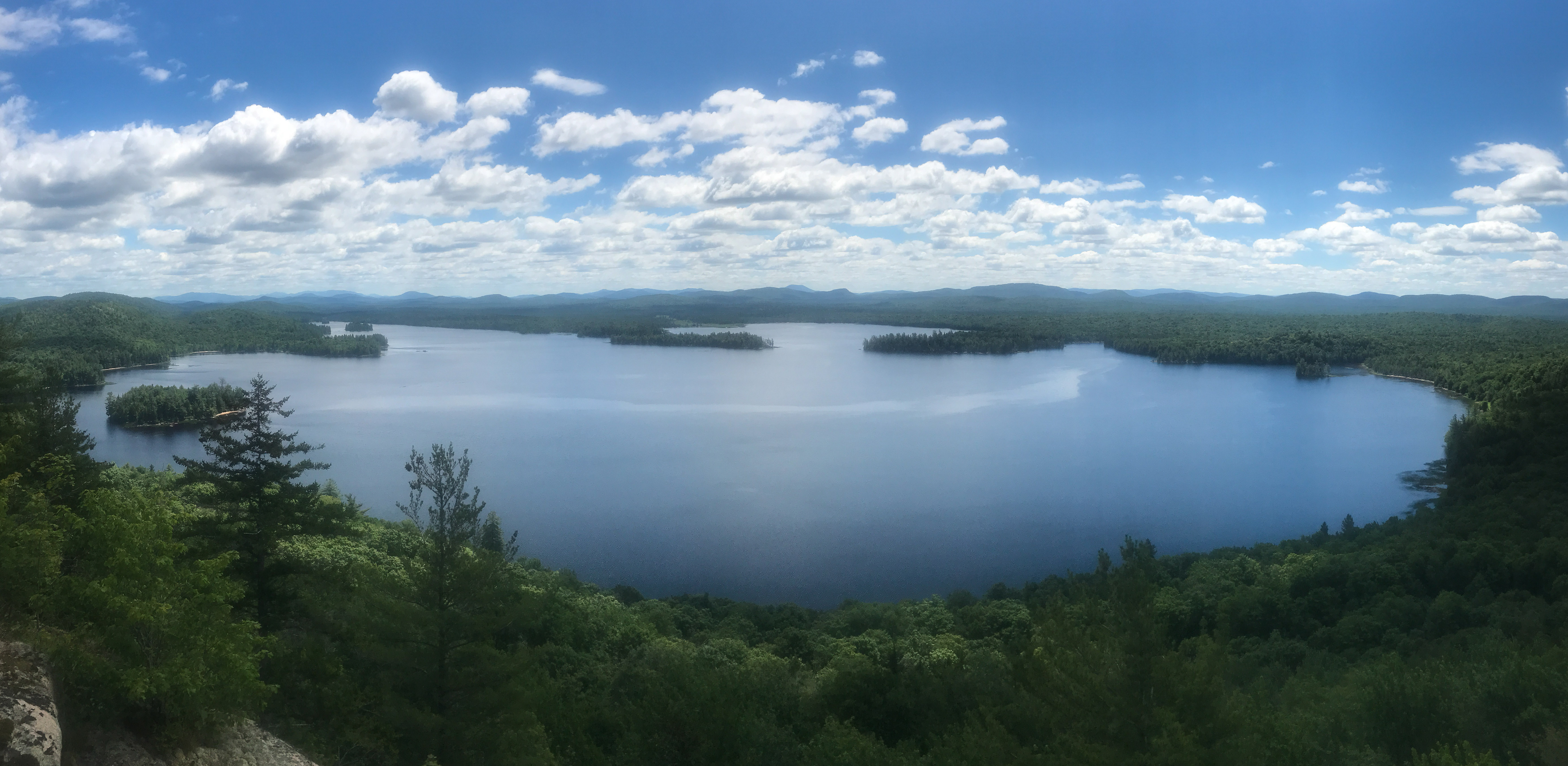
- Lake Lila, from Mount Frederica

- Location within New York Lake Lila (the United States)
- Location: Adirondacks, Hamilton County, New York, United States
- Coordinates: 44°00′10″N 74°45′15″W
- Type: Lake
- Primary inflows: Shingle Shanty Brook
- Primary outflows: Beaver River
- Basin countries: United States
- Max. length: 2.6 mi (4.2 km)
- Max. width: 2 mi (3.2 km)
- Surface area: 1,436-acre (5.81 km^{2})
- Average depth: 15 feet (4.6 m)
- Max. depth: 64 feet (20 m)
- Shore length^{1}: 8.8 miles (14.2 km)
- Surface elevation: 1,716 ft (523 m)
- Islands: 6
- ^{1} Shore length is not a well-defined measure.

Lake Lila is a remote 1,436-acre (5.81 km^{2}) lake in the William C. Whitney Wilderness Area, in the west-central portion of the Adirondack Park. It is accessed via a 6-mile (9.7 km) dirt road. Boat access to the lake is by hand-launch only, after a 0.3-mile (0.48 km) portage from the parking lot.

It is the twenty-second largest body of water in the park, and the largest lake in the Adirondack Park whose shoreline is entirely state-owned. Of the 100 largest lakes in the park, it is one of only five which are free of motorboats, jetskis, and floatplanes, including Lows, Little Tupper, Round, and Saint Regis Pond.

The southeastern portion of Lake Lila is an extensive wetland drained by the Shingle Shanty Brook, which feeds the lake; the lake is drained by the Beaver River. The lake is bordered by 2,220-foot (680 m) Mount Frederica.

There are 24 primitive campsites, 18 of which are accessible only by boat.

Fish found within Lake Lila include smallmouth bass, lake trout, yellow perch, and brown bullhead. Landlocked salmon and brook trout are present in very small numbers.

== History ==
Lake Lila was previously called Smith Lake. William Seward Webb assembled a 115,000-acre (470 km^{2}) preserve, called Nehasane Park, in the process of creating the Mohawk and Malone Railway in 1892. Webb built a Great Camp, Forest Lodge, on the western shore of Smith Lake, which he renamed for his wife Lila (Eliza Osgood Vanderbilt Webb).

In 1979, New York State acquired the 7,200 acres (29 km^{2}) of Nehasane Park surrounding Lake Lila; Forest Lodge was razed by the state at the request of the Webb family as part of the acquisition process. The railway station that formerly served the lodge still stands. The area was originally known as Lake Lila Primitive Area, before it was made a part of the William C. Whitney Wilderness Area in 1997. The railroad right-of-way is being renovated by owner New York State in 2021-2022, after a total lack of service since 1981, and the Adirondack Railroad will begin tourist passenger service from Utica through the former Webb lands in 2022, en route to a new northern terminus of Tupper Lake (108 miles).
