= Hitchens Pond =

Lake in New York

- Location within New York Location within the United States
- Location: St. Lawrence County, New York, United States
- Coordinates: 44°06′52″N 74°39′20″W
- Primary inflows: Bog River
- Primary outflows: Bog River
- Basin countries: United States
- Surface area: 147 acres (0.59 km^{2})
- Average depth: 12 feet (3.7 m)
- Max. depth: 33 feet (10 m)
- Shore length^{1}: 3.9 miles (6.3 km)
- Surface elevation: 1,719 feet (524 m)
- Settlements: Barber Point, New York
- ^{1} Shore length is not a well-defined measure.

Hitchens Pond is located east of Barber Point, New York. Fish species present in the lake are white sucker, yellow perch, and black bullhead. Carry down access from County Road 421 to an old railroad bed past Horseshoe Lake.
