= Cranberry Lake (Ontario) =

Lake in southern Ontario, Canada

- Location within Southern Ontario
- Location: Ontario
- Coordinates: 44.770461°N 79.050018°W
- Basin countries: Canada

Cranberry Lake is a lake in the city of Kawartha Lakes, Ontario, Canada.

== See also ==
- List of lakes in Ontario
