= Cranberry Lake, New York =

Cranberry Lake
- hamlet & CDP
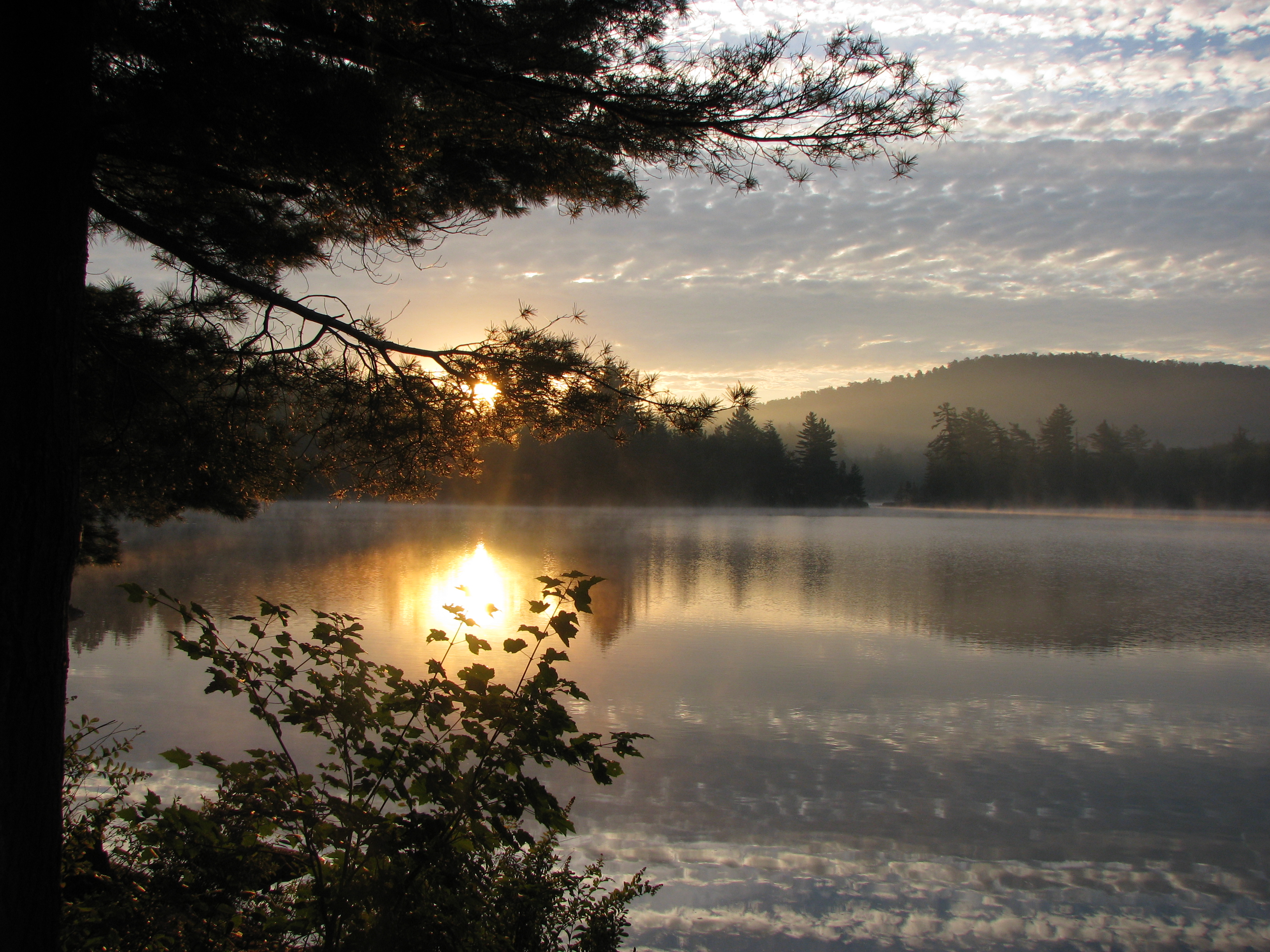
- Black Duck Hole, Cranberry Lake

- Location within the state of New York Cranberry Lake (the United States)
- Coordinates: 44°13′21″N 074°50′11″W
- Country: United States
- State: New York
- County: St. Lawrence County
- Town: Town of Clifton

Area
  - Total: 19.71 sq mi (51.06 km^{2})
  - Land: 19.42 sq mi (50.31 km^{2})
  - Water: 0.29 sq mi (0.75 km^{2})
- Elevation: 1,489 ft (454 m)

Population (2020)
  - Total: 174
  - Density: 9.0/sq mi (3.46/km^{2})
- Time zone: UTC-5 (Eastern (EST))
  - Summer (DST): UTC-4 (EDT)
- ZIP code: 12927
- Area code: 315
- FIPS code: 36-18817
- GNIS feature ID: 976196

Cranberry Lake is a hamlet in the eastern part of the Town of Clifton, in St. Lawrence County, New York, United States. It lies along New York State Route 3 on the north shore of Cranberry Lake. As of the 2020 census, Cranberry Lake had a population of 174. The community is listed as a census-designated place.

Cranberry Lake is the 3rd largest lake in the Adirondack Park and its surrounding land is primarily undeveloped and state owned. The Cranberry Lake area has many ponds, streams, and mountains with extensive trails, such as the Cranberry Lake 50, a 50-mile hiking trail around the Lake.

There is one remaining historic building in Cranberry Lake, the Presbyterian Church, built in 1897, that has been restored to a community gathering location in the center of town.

== Geography ==
Cranberry Lake is located at 44°13′21″N 074°50′11″W (44.2225615, -74.8362986) and its elevation is 1,489 feet (454 m).

According to the 2010 United States census, the CDP has a total area of 19.713 square miles (51.06 km^{2}), of which 19.437 square miles (50.34 km^{2}) is land and 0.276 square miles (0.71 km^{2}) is water.

== Demographics ==
Historical population
Census	Pop.	Note	%±
2020	174		—
U.S. Decennial Census

== Education ==
The census-designated place is in the Clifton-Fine Central School District.
