= West Branch Oswegatchie River =

- Location of the mouth of the West Branch Oswegatchie River West Branch Oswegatchie River (the United States)

Location
- Country: United States
- State: New York
- Counties: Herkimer, Lewis, St. Lawrence

Physical characteristics
- Source: Hog Pond
  - location: NNE of Moshier Falls
  - coordinates: 43°59′16″N 75°04′02″W
- Mouth: Oswegatchie River
  - location: Talcville
  - coordinates: 44°18′02″N 75°19′55″W
  - elevation: 595 ft (181 m)
- Basin size: 280 sq mi (730 km^{2})

Basin features
- Tributaries
  - right: Middle Branch Oswegatchie River

The West Branch Oswegatchie River is a river in Herkimer, Lewis, and St. Lawrence counties in New York. It starts at the outlet of Hog Pond and flows into the Oswegatchie River near the hamlet of Talcville. The West Branch Oswegatchie River is slower-moving than the Middle Branch, which flows into it. But the still waters such as Long Pond, Round Pond, Rock Pond, Mud Pond and Long Level are separated by hard-to-traverse rapids and/or waterfalls.

== Tributaries ==
Right

Moncrief Creek
Hogs Back Creek
Desert Creek
Trout Lake
Blue Swamp Creek
Blanchard Creek
Kimball Creek
Middle Branch Oswegatchie River
South Creek
Meadow Brook
Big Creek
Toothaker Creek
Mott Creek
Bennett Brook

Left

Compo Creek
Pine Creek
Oswegatchie Creek
Clear Creek
Black Creek
Hall Creek
