= Grassy Pond (Five Ponds, New York) =

- Location of Grassy Pond within New York
- Location: Herkimer County, New York
- Coordinates: 44°00′53″N 74°54′18″W
- Type: Lake
- Basin countries: United States
- Surface area: 40 acres (16 ha)
- Surface elevation: 2,001 ft (610 m)
- Settlements: Little Rapids

Grassy Pond is a small lake north-northwest of Little Rapids in Herkimer County, New York. It drains southwest via an unnamed creek which flows into Oven Lake.

== See also ==
- List of lakes in New York
