= Middle Branch Oswegatchie River =

- Location of the mouth Middle Branch Oswegatchie River (the United States)

Location
- Country: United States
- State: New York
- Regions: North Country, Central New York Region
- Counties: Lewis, Herkimer, St. Lawrence

Physical characteristics
- Source: Walker Lake
  - location: Northeast of Stillwater
  - coordinates: 43°57′54″N 74°56′47″W
- Mouth: West Branch Oswegatchie River
  - location: Harrisville
  - coordinates: 44°07′22″N 75°19′35″W
  - elevation: 821 ft (250 m)
- Basin size: 108 sq mi (280 km^{2})

Basin features
- Tributaries
  - left: Lees Creek, Glasby Creek, Wolf Creek, Palmer Creek, Panther Creek, Browns Creek
  - right: Sand Lake Outlet, Coyer Creek, Bassetts Creek, Pins Creek, Mullins Marsh Creek, Fish Creek

Middle Branch Oswegatchie River is a river in northern New York. It begins northeast of the Hamlet of Stillwater and flows into the West Branch Oswegatchie River in Harrisville. The Middle Branch mostly consists of shallow and fast-moving waters with only two or three slow-moving sections favorable for canoeists. These include Alder Bed Flow and another still-water section known locally as Moynehan Flow. The latter begins in the area where Lower South Pond Outlet runs into the river. Occasionally, experienced kayakers take advantage of high water conditions to ply its waters – generally from the Bear Pond Road, a few miles upstream of Alder Bed Flow, and downstream to another seasonal access road located near Mullins Flow. However, because they are seasonal roads and the area is so remote – this part of the river is seldom used. Brook trout exist as the primary sport-fish for the entire length of Middle Branch Oswegatchie. Chubs & bullheads are also present in its waters.
