= Beaver River (New York) =

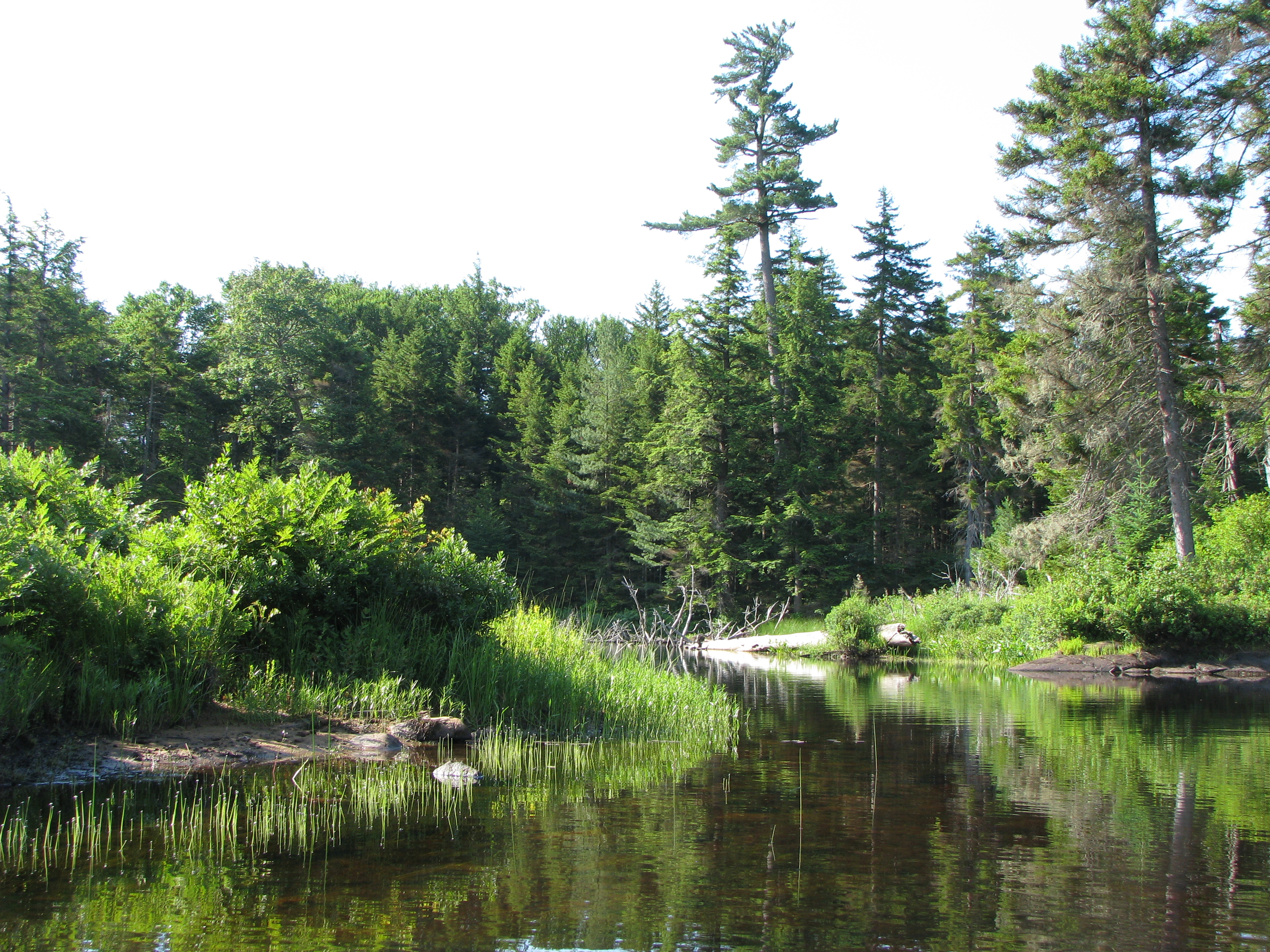
- The Beaver River near Lake Lila

Location
- Country: United States
- State: New York
- Region: Adirondack Mountains

Physical characteristics
- Source: Lake Lila
- Mouth: Black River
  - location: Castorland, New York
  - coordinates: 43°53′36″N 75°30′13″W
  - elevation: 720 ft (220 m)
- Basin size: 323 mi^{2} (840 km^{2})

Basin features
- Tributaries
  - left: Sunday Creek, Murmur Creek, Black Creek
  - right: Alder Creek, Mosier Creek, Alder Creek, Sammys Creek, Wildmeyer Creek

The Beaver River is a small mountain stream which flows from the Adirondack Mountains to the Black River at Naumburg, north of Lowville in northwestern New York. The Beaver flows through parts of Hamilton, Herkimer, and Lewis counties. Its source is Lake Lila in Long Lake.

Owing to its high gradient as it drops out of the mountains, the Beaver is a favorite destination for whitewater kayakers and canoeists. In September of each year, hundreds of whitewater paddlers descend on the Beaver from all parts of the US and eastern Canada.

Also because of its high gradient, there are several hydropower projects along the Beaver's course. These projects, created between 1905 and 1920 have fostered a series of highly productive fisheries in the reservoir chain. Popular among locals, the Soft Maple Reservoir is an excellent Smallmouth Bass fishery.

The hamlet of Beaver River at the east end of Stillwater Reservoir, in the town of Webb has a year-round population of three that increases during the summer as many people have camps in this wilderness area. No roads lead to the hamlet; it is accessible only by hiking, rail car or boat in the summer and by snowmobile, snowshoes or cross country skis in the winter.

== Fishing ==
The Beaver River is a true northern freshwater fishery, consisting of Northern Pike, Pickerel, Walleye, Smallmouth Bass, Bullhead, Catfish, Muskellenge, Carp, and Sunfish. Smallmouth Bass are a staple of the river, and it is not uncommon to catch a nice 20" bass anywhere is the upper reservoirs, particularly Effley and Soft Maple. Soft Maple Reservoir is the only place on the Beaver River that supports a population of Tiger Muskellenge, which are stocked on a periodic basis by the NYS DEC.

== See also ==
- List of New York rivers
