= William C. Whitney Wilderness Area =

Wilderness area in New York, United States

- IUCN category Ib (wilderness area)
- Location within the United States
- Location: Adirondack Park New York USA
- Nearest city: Long Lake, NY
- Coordinates: 44.00126°N 74.64789°W
- Area: 20,560 acres (83.2 km^{2})
- Governing body: New York State Department of Environmental Conservation

The William C. Whitney Wilderness Area, an Adirondack Park unit of New York's Forest Preserve, is located in the town of Long Lake, Hamilton County. It is bounded on the east by Hamilton County Route 10, on the south by lands of Whitney Industries, on the west by private lands owned by The Nature Conservancy and the Brandreth Park Association, on the northwest by the Remsen to Lake Placid Railroad right-of-way, and on the north by other private land holdings. The area contains 12 bodies of water covering 4,286 acres (17.34 km^{2}) and 20 miles (32 km) of foot trails. The area is named for William C. Whitney, who was an American political leader and financier.

== Geography ==
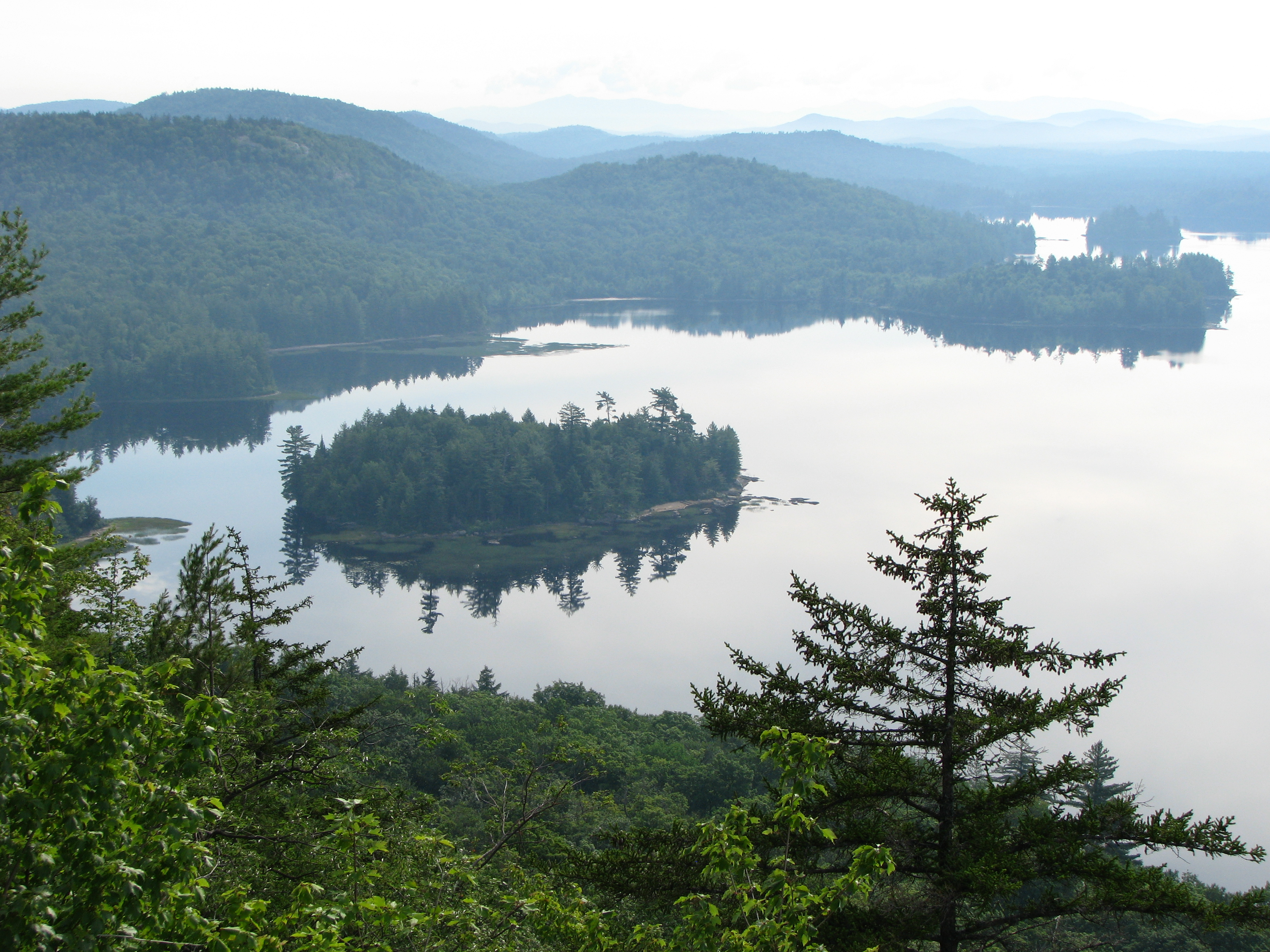
Canada Island, Lake Lila, from Mount Frederica

The terrain consists of lakes, ponds, wetlands, and low forested hills with a few modest mountains ranging as high as 2,297-foot (700 m) Antediluvian Mountain. The centerpieces of this area are 2,300 acres (9.3 km^{2}) Little Tupper Lake and 1,400 acres (5.7 km^{2}) Lake Lila, respectively the seventeenth and twenty-second largest water bodies in the Adirondack Park. This area also includes twelve smaller water bodies, a short section of the Beaver River, pond and lake outlets and numerous other small streams and flows. There are extensive wetland complexes within the area, particularly along the western end of Little Tupper Lake and the southeastern portions of Lake Lila.

The vast expanses of the area are important to many species of mammals and the area abounds with bird life.

== Recreation ==
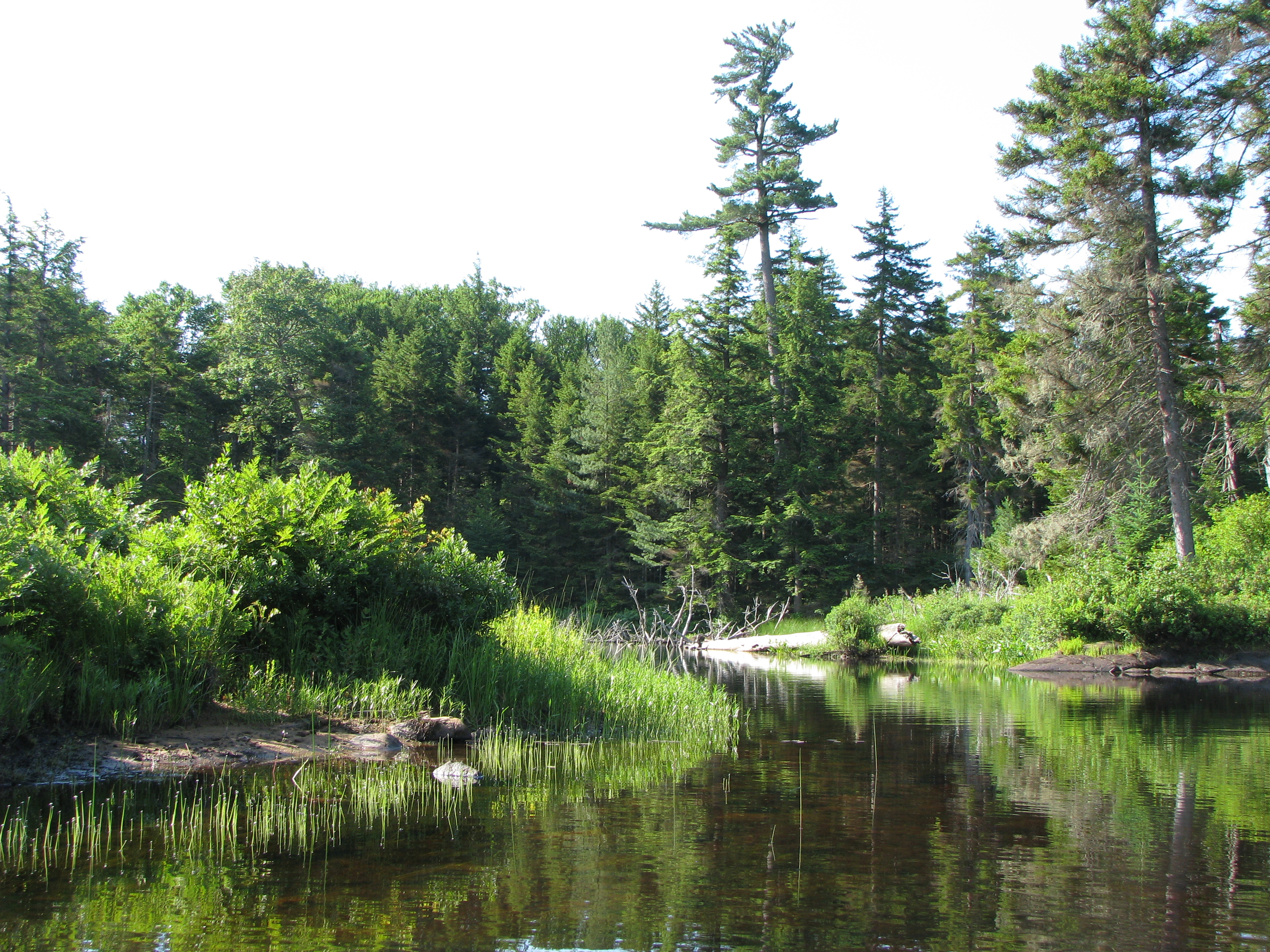
The Beaver River near Lake Lila

The area is a popular destination for canoeing. It also contains an extensive network of old logging roads which provide prime cross-country skiing trails.

== History ==
In 1897, William Collins Whitney purchased 68,000 acres (280 km^{2}) of land to create the privately owned Whitney Park, including the lands which now comprise this wilderness. After Whitney's death in 1904, his family retained ownership of the tract. In 1997, the family sold a portion of the property to New York State. The area was subsequently combined with adjacent state lands to form the present wilderness area.

== See also ==
- List of Wilderness Areas in the Adirondack Park
