= Cranberry Lake 50 =

Long-distance hiking trail in the United States

- Length: 50 mi (80 km)
- Location: Adirondack Park, New York, United States
- Use: Hiking, Backpacking
- Difficulty: Easy to Moderate Grade
- Season: Any
- Sights: Adirondack Mountains, Adirondack Park
- Hazards: Severe Weather
- Website: https://cranberrylake50.org

Trail map
- Map

Cranberry Lake 50 is a recreational trail around Cranberry Lake in northeastern New York state, U.S. The trail is 50 miles (80 km) long.

The Cranberry Lake 50 trail was proposed in 1994 and completed by 2008.

== See also ==
- Long-distance trails in the United States
