= Lows Lake (New York) =

Lake in Adirondack Park, NY, USA

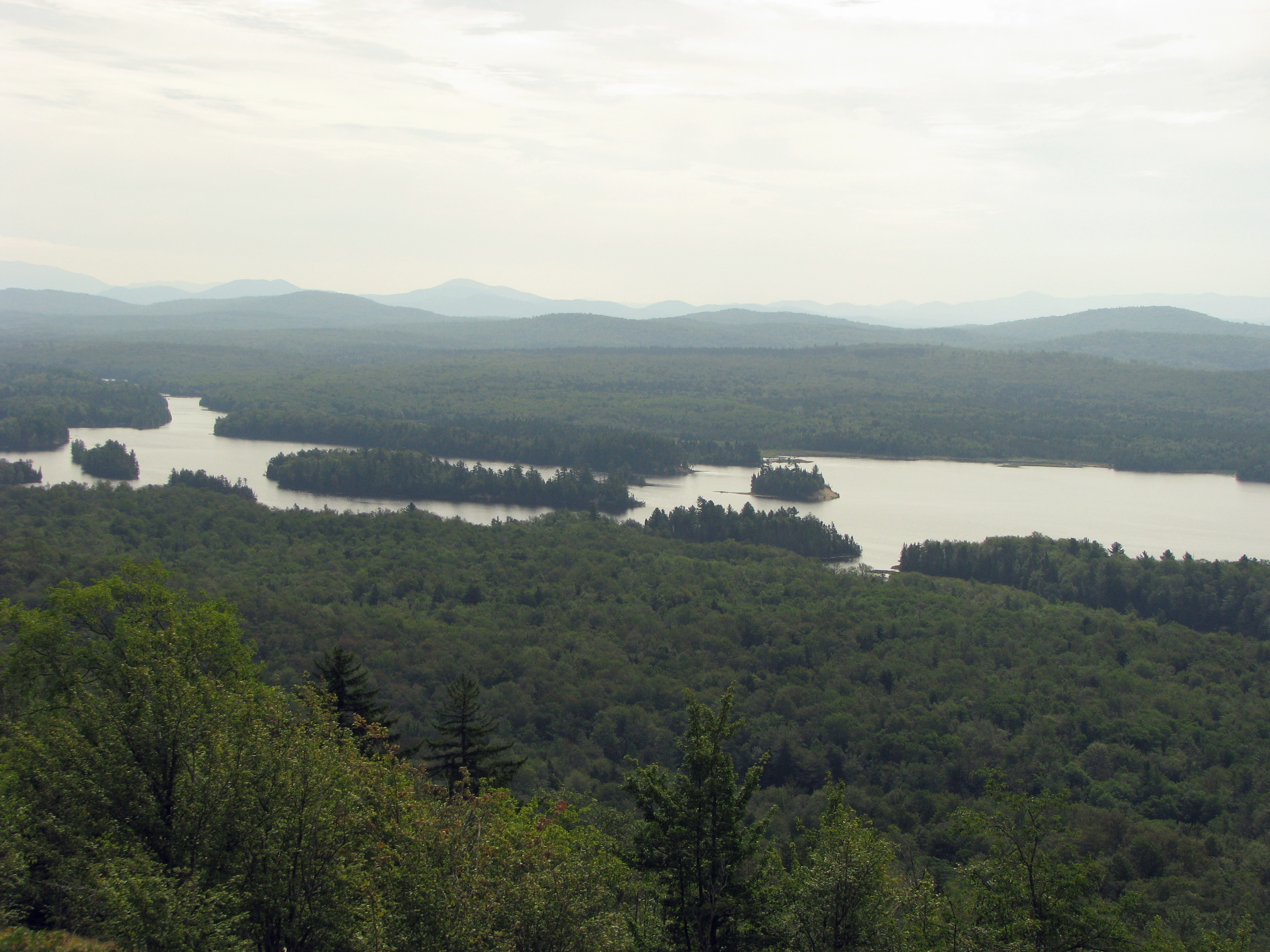
- Low's Lake, looking southwest from Grass Pond Mountain

- Location within New York Lows Lake (the United States)
- Location: Colton, New York and Long Lake, New York
- Coordinates: 44°06′22″N 74°40′35″W
- Type: Reservoir
- Primary inflows: Bog River Flow
- Primary outflows: Bog River Flow
- Basin countries: United States
- Surface area: 2,845 acres (11.51 km^{2})
- Average depth: 5 feet (1.5 m)
- Max. depth: 55 feet (17 m)
- Shore length^{1}: 30.4 miles (48.9 km)
- Surface elevation: 1,742 ft (531 m)
- Islands: 30
- ^{1} Shore length is not a well-defined measure.

Lows Lake is located in the Adirondack Park in northeastern New York. It is in the New York State Forest Preserve Five Ponds Wilderness Area, 10 miles (16 km) southwest of Tupper Lake. The Adirondack Park Agency classifies the lake as a Primitive Area meaning that it is wilderness in character, but contains artificial structures and private lands.

It is also named Bog River Flow, since it was artificially created by damming the river of that name.

The area is home to Sabattis Scout Reservation, a multi-thousand acre summer camp for Boy Scouts.

== History ==
The lake was created by the eponymous Abbot Augustus Low, who dammed the Bog River to create a hydroelectric reservoir. The first, now known as Lows Lower dam, was built in 1903, to provide electricity for the Horseshoe Forestry Company. A second, now Lows Upper dam, was added in 1907 and created Lows Lake from Mud Lake, Bog River Flow, Tomar Pond, and Grass Pond. These were part of Low's commercial enterprise which included railways connecting the area with New York City, and the production of maple syrup and lumber.

On the granite ledge above the second dam, there is a plaque commemorating Low's memory. His ashes were spread from the ledge.

== Recreation ==
The lake has about 35 primitive campsites. Access is via a short gravel road off New York State Route 421 to Lows Lower Dam where small craft can be hand launched. Fishing is predominantly for the introduced and plentiful largemouth bass. There is also some brown bullhead and brook trout.

The length of the large shallow lake aligns with the prevailing winds, and wind can create a small craft hazard due to rough water.

At the western end of the lake is a three and a half mile portage to the Oswegatchie River which passes by Big Deer Pond and a long esker before reaching the upper source of the Oswegatchie.

== Scouting ==
On the Eastern end of the lake along the northern shore is Sabattis Scout Reservation, an extensive, wilderness-based summer camp owned by the Longhouse Council, Boy Scouts of America. Sabattis is also home to the James " Marmaduke" Seton Trek Center, a launching point for backcountry treks throughout the Adirondack Mountains.

Sabattis Scout Reservation used to have two camps; Trout Ponds and Three Islands when first constructed in the 1960s. In the late 1980s, due to a lack of attendance, Three Islands was closed to camping, and the buildings were used for storage. All former campgrounds are overgrown. Only a dirt road to Lows Lake launching beach is left for canoe treks.

== Conservation ==
The lake is one of New York's largest loon nesting areas.

The New York State Department of Environmental Conservation prohibits mechanically propelled boats between the upper and lower dams. Although the Adirondack Park State Land Master Plan states that the lake is "part of the Lows Lake-Bog River-Oswegatchie wilderness canoe route", banned floatplanes, and motorboat usage by the public, motors continue to be used by owners of the private in-holdings. The northeast shore is private, along with a few small parcels bordering the lake.

== Geography ==
Grass Pond Mountain, 2,240 feet (680 m), is north of the lake and has expansive views from its summit. Graves Mountain, 2,300 feet (700 m), is named after a 19th-century hunter from Tupper Lake; its southern flank was eroded after the forest fire of 1906, exposing a large granite face; a survey marker is located at its peak.

The lake contains two large floating bogs.
