= Massawepie =

Massawepie may refer to:

- Massawepie Lake, a lake in Piercefield, New York, U.S.
- Massawepie Mire, the largest bog in New York State
- Massawepie, New York, a place in New York, U.S.
- Massawepie Scout Camp, a Boy Scout reservation, on Massawepie Lake, New York, U.S.
