= Rochester Council =

Rochester Council may be:

- Rochester Council (Minnesota)
- Rochester Council (New York)
