= Kingston Council =

Kingston Council may be:

- Kingston upon Thames London Borough Council
- Kingston Council, BSA
