= Scouting in New York =

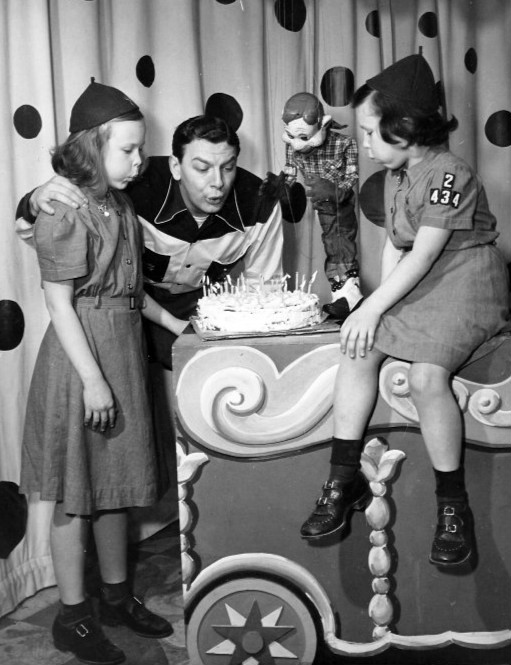
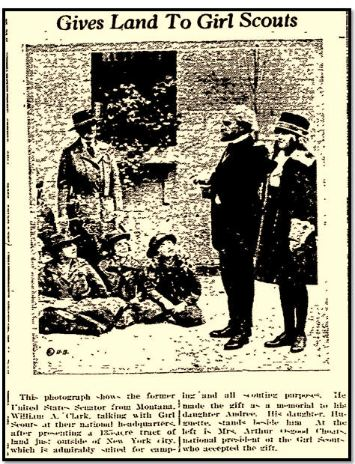
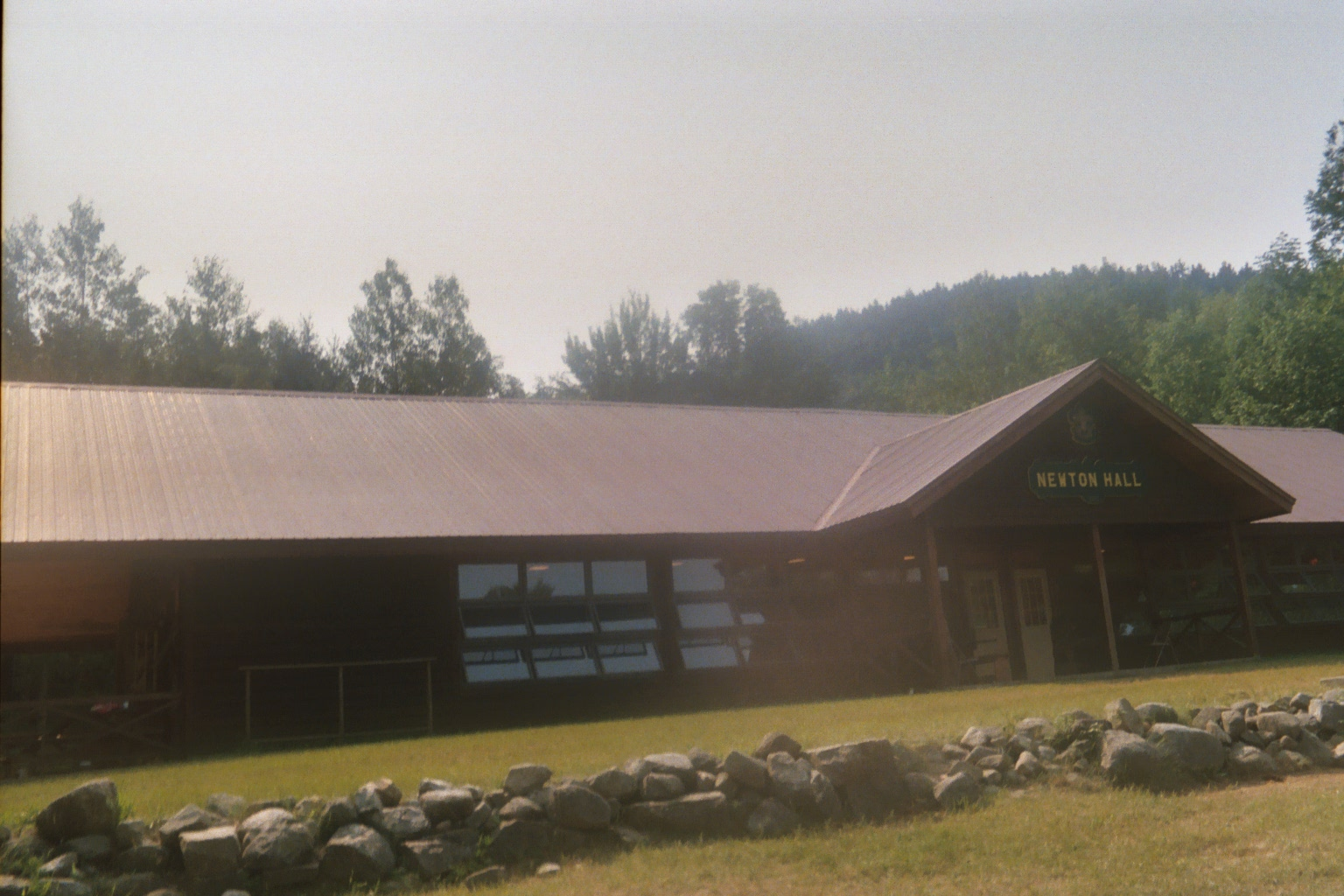
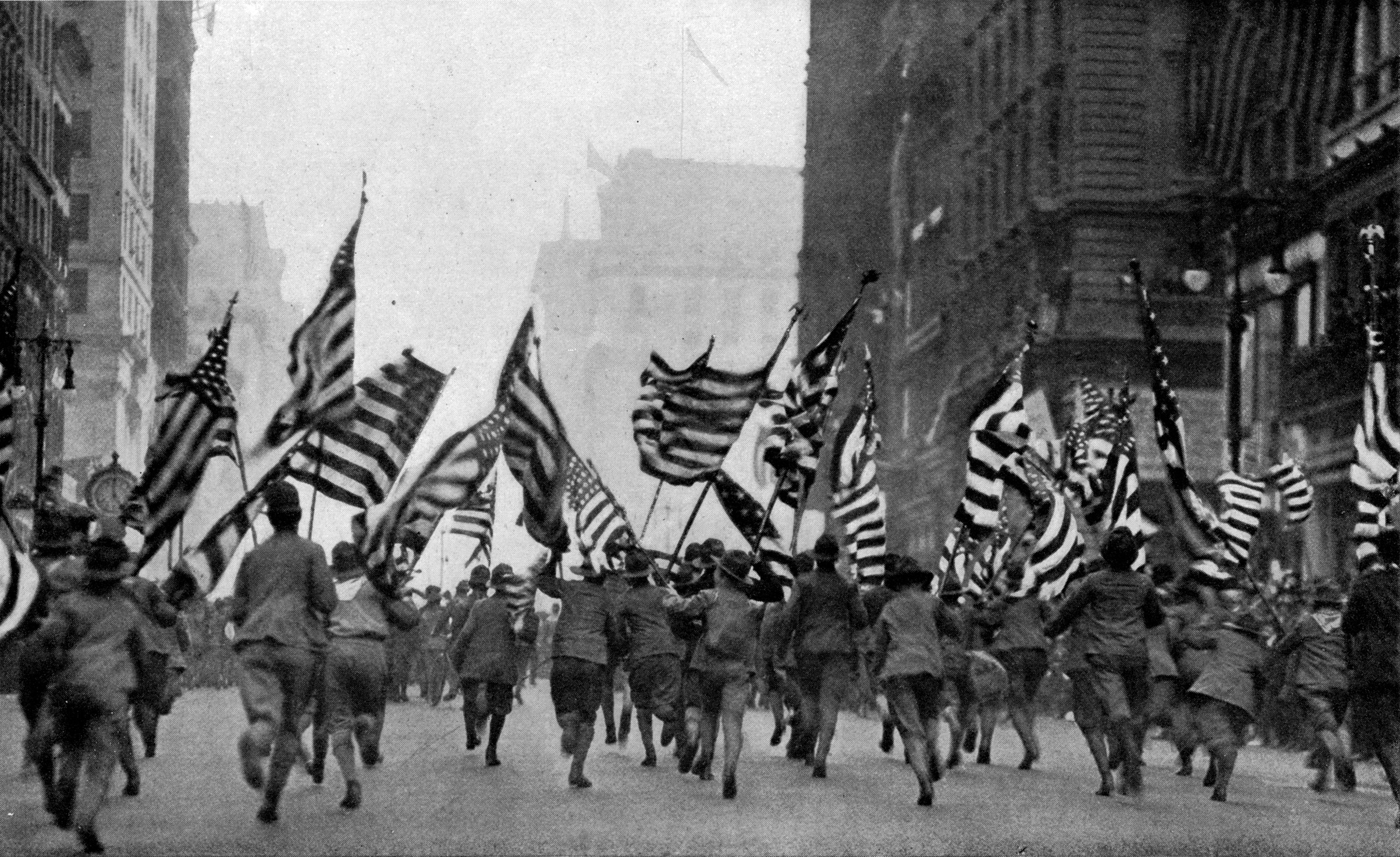
- Girl Scouts 38th Anniversary on Howdy Doody Camp Andree Clark Newton Hall, Camp Buckskin Fifth Avenue, Manhattan - 1917

Scouting in New York has a long history, from the 1910s to the present day, serving thousands of youth in programs that suit the environment in which they live. The first National Boy Scouts of America (BSA) Headquarters was in New York City, and the Girl Scouts of the USA National Headquarters is currently located at 420 Fifth Avenue, New York City.

== Early history (1910-1950) ==
On September 10, 1910, S. F. Lester of Troy, New York, became the first person to hold the Scouting leadership position of Scoutmaster (approved by the BSA). He received his certification from the BSA headquarters in New York City. In 1910 he led a group of 30 scouts at Camp Ilium, in Pownal, Vermont. Camp Ilium was the starting point of the Boy Scout Movement for Troy, and Pownal. Pownal is only 35 miles (56 km) away from Troy.

Following the lead of the State of Michigan, the State of New York formed its own Forest Scouts. This group was formed in response to a number of late 19th century and early 20th century forest fires and were effectively "auxiliary fire wardens".

The 1924 National Order of the Arrow Lodge Meeting was held at Kanohwanke Scout Camp near Tuxedo, New York and the 1929 National Lodge Meeting was held at Philadelphia, Pennsylvania.

The Boy Scouts of America National Headquarters were established in 1910 in New York City and opened in January 1911.

== Recent history (1950-present) ==
In the 1970s and again in the 1990s, upstate New York went through a huge consolidation of small, historic councils.^{[a]}

== Scouting today ==
=== Boy Scouts ===
There are fourteen Boy Scouts of America (BSA) local councils in New York.

==== Allegheny Highlands Council ====
Allegheny Highlands Council (#382)
- Owner: Scouting America
- Headquarters: Falconer, New York
- Website www.alleghenyhighlands.org

The Allegheny Highlands Council serves Scouts in Chautauqua, Cattaraugus, and Allegany counties in New York and McKean and Potter counties in Pennsylvania. Its Service Center is located in Falconer, New York.

===== History =====
In 1917, the Dunkirk Council was formed, closing in 1918.^{[a]}

In 1917, the Olean Council was formed, closing in 1918.^{[a]}

In 1917, the Salamanca Council was formed, closing in 1919.^{[a]}

In 1917, the Jamestown Council (#382) was formed, changing its name to the Chautauqua County Council (#382) in 1925. It changed its name again to the Chautauqua Lake Area Council (#382) in 1932.^{[a]}

In 1932, Chautauqua Lake Area Council (#382) was created, and in 1929 the Lake Shore Council (#407) was created. Both councils merged in 1941 to become the Chautauqua County Council (#382).^{[a]}

In 1926, the Cattaraugus Council (#750) was formed, changing its name to the Seneca Council (#750) in 1929.^{[a]}

In 1973, the Allegheny Highlands Council (#382) was formed from a merger of the Seneca Council (#750), Chautauqua County Council (#382), and the Elk Lick Council (#499).^{[a]}

===== Organization =====
The council is divided into two districts:

- Western Gate District
- Two Lakes District

===== Camps =====
It has two camps: Camp Merz and Elk Lick Scout Reserve. Elk Lick is tucked into the heart of the Allegheny Mountains in Smethport, Pennsylvania, and operates exclusively as a Cub Scout summer camp. Camp Merz is located on Lake Chautauqua, just up the road from the Chautauqua Institution in western New York, and is a Scouts BSA summer camp. Camp Merz has a waterfront and many waterfront-related merit badges available for scouts. Both camps are opens to all scouts for year-round camping.

===== Order of the Arrow =====
- Ho-Nan-Ne-Ho-Ont Lodge 165

==== Baden-Powell Council ====
Baden-Powell Council (#368)
- Owner: Scouting America
- Headquarters: Binghamton, NY
- Website bpcouncil.org

The Baden-Powell Council was formed in 1998 by the merger of the former Baden-Powell Council (headquartered in Dryden, New York) and Susquenango Council (headquartered in Binghamton, New York). The council's new headquarters are in Binghamton. The council covers five counties in New York State—Broome, Chenango, Cortland, Tioga and Tompkins—as well as Susquehanna County in Pennsylvania.

===== History =====
In 1917, the Cortland Council was founded, closing in 1918. In 1921, the Norwich Council was formed, merging into the Binghamton Council (#368) in 1924.^{[a]}

In 1918 the Binghamton Council (#368) was formed, changing its name to the Susquenango Council (#368) in 1920.^{[a]}

In 1918 the Johnson City and Endicott Council (#383) was formed, changing its name to the Fairplay Council (#383) in 1932.^{[a]}

In 1917 the Ithaca Council (#381) was formed, changing its name to the Thompkins County Council (#381) in 1926. Thompkins County (#381) changed its name to the Louis Agassiz Fuertes Council (#381) in 1929.^{[a]}

In 1925 the Fairplay Council (#383) was formed, merging into the Susquenango Council (#368) in 1932. In 1998, the Susquenango Council (#368) merged with the Baden-Powell Council (#381). The combined councils took the name Baden-Powell and the number (#368).^{[a]}

In 1929 the Louis Agassiz Fuertes Council (#381) was formed. In 1940 the Tioughnioga Council (#383) was formed. In 1975, the two council merged to become the Baden-Powell Council (#381).^{[a]}

In 1998, the Baden-Powell Council (#381) and the Susquenango Council (#368) merged to become Baden-Powell Council (#368).^{[a]}

===== Organization =====
As of 2017, the council has four districts:

- Chenango District (Chenango County and part of Broome County)
- Delahanna District (Susquehanna County in Pennsylvania)
- Hiawatha District (Tioga County and part of Broome County)
- Taughannock District (Cortland and Tompkins Counties)

===== Camps =====
The Baden-Powell Council operates one Scout Camp:

Tuscarora Scout Reservation is a Boy Scouts of America camp located on 1200 acres (4.5 km^{2}) around Summit Lake in New York State's Southern Tier.

The camp has ten summer camping sites with 2-man platform tents. It has five winter units with a center lodge equipped with wood stoves, refrigerators and electricity and four 8-man lean-tos. Tuscarora Scout Reservation also offers a renovated Nature lodge, dining hall, a nationally known Handicraft program, and a 40-foot (12 m), progressively more difficult climbing wall with free rappel. They also offer mountainboarding, paddleboard, shotgun and rifle range as well as multiple Wilderness Programs and Scoutcraft programs. The camp is available year-round for camping, hiking as well as shotgun and rifle programs. Tuscarora Scout Reservation hosts over 500 Scouts and leaders each January and February for its Winter Camp programs. Tuscarora hosts the Council's annual National Youth Leadership Training Course every August.

It formerly operated another:

Camp Barton, founded in 1927, was a Scouts BSA of America camp located on 130 acres (0.5 km^{2}) on Frontenac Point on the west shore of Cayuga Lake in New York State's Finger Lakes. It is approximately nine miles north of Ithaca.

Camp Barton has nine summer camping sites with 2- and 4-man platform tents, as well as a winter lean-to site in one of the two gorges which surround the camp. The camp facilities include many water-based activities on the camp's quarter-mile of waterfront, including rowing, motorboating, sailing, waterskiing, jetskiing and swimming, as well as handicraft, nature, rifle and archery ranges, and scoutcraft areas.

The Camp's buildings and cabins are available for off-season use by Scouting and other youth organizations. The camp was sold from 2022 to 2025 as the council worked to help fund settlements over sex abuse cases filed against the BSA. A large portion of the land was sold to New York State, who opened it to the public as Three Falls State Park.

===== Order of the Arrow =====
The corresponding Order of the Arrow lodge is Otahnagon Lodge 172.

==== Connecticut Rivers Council ====
Connecticut Rivers Council (#66)
- Owner: Scouting America
- Headquarters: Hartford, CT
- Founded: 1995
- Board Chair: Shannon Smith
- Council Commissioner: Robert Sanford
- Scout Executive: Mark Switzer
- Website www.ctscouting.org

The Connecticut Rivers Council serves the majority of the State of Connecticut in addition to Fisher's Island in New York.

The corresponding Order of the Arrow Lodge is Tschitani Lodge #10.

==== Five Rivers Council ====
Five Rivers Council (#375)
- Owner: Scouting America
- Headquarters: Horseheads, NY
- Website www.fiverivers.org

Five Rivers Council serves Scouts in the Southern tier of New York and the Northern tier of Pennsylvania.

===== History =====
In 1917, the Hornell Council was founded, closing in 1918. In 1918, the Corning Council was founded, closing in 1919.^{[a]}

In 1915, the Elmira Council (#375) was founded, changing its name to the Chemung County Council (#375) in 1926. In 1927 the council changed its name Elmira Area Council (#375), and again in 1947 to Sullivan Trail Council (#375). In 1922, the Steuben County Council (#402) was founded, changing its name to the Steuben Area Council (#402) in 1931.^{[a]}

In 1991 Steuben Area Council (#402) and Sullivan Trail Council (#375) merged to become the Five Rivers Council (#375). In 1992, General Sullivan Council (#779) merged into the Five Rivers Council.^{[a]}

===== Organization =====
The council is divided into three districts:

- Endless Mountains District
- Big Horn District
- Silver Fawn District

===== Camps =====
It operates two camps: Camp Brulé, in North East Pennsylvania, and Camp Gorton on Waneta Lake in New York.

Camp Gorton

Camp Gorton, located on Waneta Lake in the middle of the Finger Lakes, provides over 350 acres of land in Upstate New York for Scouts BSA camps. In 2014 Camp Gorton celebrated its 92nd year of existence and 90th anniversary of being a scout camp on the east side of Waneta Lake.

Camp Gorton claims to provide programs that are well-suited for younger scouts and has waterfront and shooting sports programs. They also provide programs to earn many water focused merit badges.

Camp Brulé

Camp Brulé (pronounced "Brul-a"), named after Étienne Brûlé, is in Sullivan County, Pennsylvania. It was founded by the General Sullivan Council with headquarters in Athens and jurisdiction over Bradford, Tioga and Sullivan Counties.

The camp covers the forty-two acres of Elk Lake and 200 acres (0.8 km^{2}) of forest land bordering it. Pancost Hall and Crandall Hall are memorials to Alfred H. Pancost, Chief Scout Executive and founder, and to Harry H. Crandall, first president of the council.

On the parade ground a native boulder bears a bronze plaque in memory of Eagle Scout twin brothers from Troop 2, Towanda, Pennsylvania, Army Air Corp Lieutenants John R. and William G. Winter. Born August 11, 1925, they were killed in action in World War II on August 11, 1945. The plaque was erected by employees of the Patterson Screen Company.

===== Order of the Arrow =====
TKäen DōD Lodge 30 formed from three former lodges. Seneca Lodge 394, Wakanda Lodge 186, and Winingus Lodge 30. TKäen DōD celebrated its 25th anniversary in 2017.

==== Greater Hudson Valley Council ====
Greater Hudson Valley Council (#388)
- Owner: Scouting America
- Headquarters: Fishkill, NY
- Country: United States
- Founded: 2021
- Website www.ghvbsa.org

The Greater Hudson Valley Council was formed in 2021 when the Hudson Valley Council merged with the Westchester-Putnam Council. This council serves scouts in southeastern New York.

Daniel Carter Beard is buried at the Brick Church Cemetery, which lies within the council boundaries. Every year on February 8, in commemoration of Founders Day, local Scouts place a wreath on Beard's grave. A commemoration service is held there every year on his birthday.

===== History =====
In 1917, the Beacon Council was founded, closing in 1918. In 1917, the Mamaroneck Council was founded, closing in 1918. In 1917, the Peekskill Council was founded, closing in 1918.^{[a]}

In 1917 the Poughkeepsie Council was formed, changing its name to the Dutchess County Council (#374).^{[a]}

In 1926 the Sullivan County Council (#761) was formed, merging with the Orange County Council (#392) in 1930 to form the Orange-Sullivan Council (#392). In 1958, the council changed its name to the Hudson-Delaware Council (#392).^{[a]}

In 1917 the Rockland County Council (#683) was founded.^{[a]}

In 1996 the Dutchess County, Hudson-Delaware, and Rockland County councils merged to form the Hudson Valley Council (#374).^{[a]}

In 1918 the New Rochelle Council was formed, changing its name to the Westchester County Council in 1920. In 1922 the council was split into the Hendrick Hudson Council (#379) and Siwanoy Council (#401).^{[a]}

In 1917 the White Plains Council (#410) was formed, changing its name to the Fennimore Cooper Council (#410) in 1922.^{[a]}

In 1915 the Bronxville Council and Mount Vernon Council (#370) were formed, merging in 1923 to form the Bronx Valley Council (#370).^{[a]}

In 1915 the Yonkers Council (#411) was formed. In 1954 Yonkers, Fennimore Cooper and the Hendrick Hudson councils merged to form the Washington Irving Council (#388).^{[a]}

In 1958 the Bronx Valley (#370) and Siwanoy (#401) councils merged to form the Siwanoy-Bronx Valley Council (#401). In 1962 the council changed its name to the Hutchinson River Council (#401).^{[a]}

In 1974 the Hutchinson River (#401) and Washington Irving (#388) councils merged to form the Westchester-Putnam Council (#388).^{[a]}

In 2021, Hudson Valley Council (#374) merged with the Westchester-Putnam Council (#388) to become the Greater Hudson Valley Council (#388).

===== Organization =====
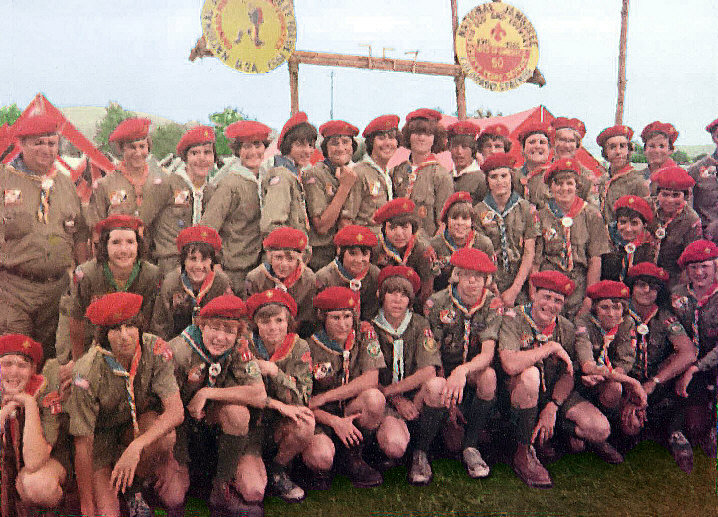
Dutchess contingent at the 1977 national Scout jamboree, held at Moraine State Park, Pennsylvania

Its districts are: Algonquin, Croton River, Dutchess, Hudson-Delaware, Mohican and Rockland.

===== Camps =====
The council operated three camp properties: Camp Bullowa in Stony Point, New York, Durland Scout Reservation in Putnam Valley, New York and Curtis S. Read Scout Reservation in Brant Lake, New York.

===== Order of the Arrow Lodge =====
- Mahicantuck 15

==== Greater New York Councils ====
Greater New York Councils (#640)
- Owner: Scouting America
- Location: 475 Riverside Drive, Suite 600 New York, NY 10115
- Country: United States
- Council President: Richard Mason
- Council Commissioner: Anthony Fiori
- Scout Executive: Saroya Friedman-Gonzalez
- Website www.nycscouting.org

The Greater New York Councils serves the Scouting families of the five boroughs of New York City.

In 1915, the Greater New York Advisory Council was founded, changing its name to the Boy Scout Federation of Greater New York Council (#719) in 1925. In 1936 the council changed its name to the Greater New York Council (#719). Since the beginning, the five boroughs of the city each maintained their own council under the umbrella of the "greater" council Bronx Council (#372), Brooklyn Council (#369), Manhattan Council (#384), Queens Council (#371), and the Staten Island Council (#396).^{[a]}

In 1967, the council was renumbered as Greater New York Council (#640) with each of the boroughs also being renumbered: Bronx Council #641), Brooklyn Council (#642), Manhattan Council (#643), Queens Council (#644), and the Staten Island Council (#645).^{[a]}

==== Leatherstocking Council ====
Leatherstocking Council (#400)
- Owner: Boy Scouts of America
- Headquarters: Utica, New York
- Country: United States
- Founded: 2016
- Website www.leatherstockingcouncil.org

Leatherstocking Council serves a portion of central New York. The council provides Scouting to Herkimer, Oneida, Schoharie, and Madison Counties as well as part of Hamilton, Otsego, Delaware and Lewis Counties.

In 1928 the Oneonta Council (#393) was formed, changing its name to the Otsego and Schoharie Counties Council (#393) in 1924. Otsego and Schoharie Counties changed its name to the Otsego-Schoharie Area Council (#393) in 1925.^{[a]}

In 1924 the Delaware County Council (#407) was formed. Delaware County merged into Otsego-Schoharie (#393) in 1926. In 1927 Otsego-Schoharie (#393) changed its name to OtSchoDela Council (#393) in 1927.^{[a]}

In 1922 the Oneida Council (#389) was formed changing its name to the Madison County Council (#389) in 1923.^{[a]}

In 1916 the Rome Council (#398) was formed. In 1919 the Sherrill Council (#400) was formed, merging into the Rome Council in 1925. In 1929, the Rome Council changed its name to the Fort Stanwix Council (#398) in 1929.^{[a]}

In 1915 the Utica Council (#406) was formed changing its name to the Upper Mohawk Council (#406) in 1937.^{[a]}

In 1968 the Madison County (#389) and Fort Stanwix (#398) councils merged to become the Iroquois Council (#395). In 1981, the Iroquois (#395) and Upper Mohawk (#406) councils merged to become the Land of the Oneidas Council (#395).^{[a]}

The first Herkimer County Council was formed in 1919, merging into the Utica Council (#406). In 1928 the Herkimer County Council (#400) was formed, changing its name to the General Herkimer Council (#400) in 1934.^{[a]}

In 2001, the Land of the Oneidas (#395) and General Herkimer (#400) councils merged, forming the Revolutionary Trails Council.^{[a]} In 2016, the Revolutionary Trails and Otschodela Councils (#393) merged to form the Leatherstocking Council (#400).

==== Longhouse Council ====
Longhouse Council (#373)
- Owner: Boy Scouts of America
- Headquarters: Syracuse, NY
- Country: United States
- Founded: 2001
- Website www.cnyscouts.org

Longhouse Council was formed in 2010 as a merger of Hiawatha Seaway Council and Cayuga County Council. The council currently owns 2 camps, including Sabattis Scouting Reservation and Camp Woodland. The council covers six counties — Cayuga, Jefferson, Lewis, Oswego, Onondaga, and St. Lawrence.

===== History =====
^{[a]}

===== Organization =====
The council is divided into seven districts:

- Cayuga County District (the former Cayuga County Council area)
- Interlakes District (Western Onondaga County)
- Northern Lights District (St. Lawrence County)
- Oneida District (Northern Onondaga County)
- Onondaga District (Southern Onondaga County)
- Ontario District (Oswego County)
- Tri-Rivers District (Jefferson and Lewis Counties)
  - As of June 2020, the Onondaga and Oneida Districts merged to become the Crossroads District

As of 30 June 2009, Longhouse Council acquired a seventh district: Cayuga County. This was previously Cayuga County Council, which lost its charter.

===== Order of the Arrow =====
Lowanne Nimat Lodge 219, formed January 1, 2010 from Kayanernh Kowa and Tahgajute lodges.

The World Brotherhood Camporee is a weekend-long camping trip that Scouts from Canada and the U.S. participate in. The camporee is an annual event and takes place either in the Longhouse Council, New York or in the Loyalist Area of the Voyageur Council, Ontario, Canada.

The main events include Council Strip trading and a dance party.

==== Rip Van Winkle Council ====
Rip Van Winkle Council (#405)
- Owner: Boy Scouts of America
- Headquarters: Kingston, NY
- Country: United States
- Founded: 1950
- Website www.rvwbsa.org

Rip Van Winkle Council serves the youth of Ulster and Greene counties of New York, and headquartered in Kingston. The Rip Van Winkle Council has the distinction of having six of the first twenty-one Eagle Scouts from the Class of 1912, the first class of Eagle Scouts.

===== History =====
In 1917, the Ellenville Council was founded. It closed in 1918.

In 1916, the Kingston Council (#405) was founded, changing its name to the Ulster County Council (#405) in 1919. In 1926, the Greene County Council (#766) was founded. In 1930 the Ulster County Council (#405) and the Greene County Council (#766) merged to form the Ulster-Greene Council (#405). In 1950, Ulster-Greene changed its name to the Rip Van Winkle Council (#405).^{[a]}

===== Organization =====
The council is divided into two districts:

- Algonquin District (Ulster County)
- Mohican District (Greene County and Saugerties)

===== Camps =====
The council's camp, located in East Jewett, New York, is Camp Tri-Mount.

===== Order of the Arrow =====
- Half Moon Lodge

==== Seneca Waterways Council ====
Seneca Waterways Council (#397)
- Owner: Boy Scouts of America
- Headquarters: Rochester, New York
- Country: United States
- Founded: 2009
- Website www.senecawaterways.org

The Seneca Waterways Council serves youth in the counties of Ontario, Wayne, Seneca, Yates, and Monroe and the city of Rochester, New York.

In 1917 the Brockport Council was formed, closing in 1918.^{[a]}

In 1917 the Ontario County Council (#391) was formed, changing its name to the Finger Lakes Council (#391) in 1924.^{[a]}

The Rochester Council (#397) was granted a charter on February 13, 1913. The council expanded to include Monroe, Orleans and Wayne counties, and in 1926 the name was changed to the Rochester Area Council (#397) to reflect the growth. In December 1932, Monroe and Orleans counties split off to become the Red Jacket Council (#363).^{[a]}

In 1943, the Wayne County portion of the Rochester Area Council (#397) was transferred to the Finger Lakes Council (#391); the Orleans County portion of the Red Jacket Council was transferred to the Lewiston Trail Council (#385), and the remaining Monroe County portion merged with the Red Jacket Council (#363) to form the Otetiana Council (#397).^{[a]}

The Seneca Waterways Council was founded in 2009 with the merger of the Finger Lakes Council (#391) and Otetiana Council (#397), both in Western New York.

Seneca Waterways Council operates two camps. Camp Cutler BSA in Naples, NY, operates mainly as a cub scout camp. Additionally, SWC operates Massawepie Scout Camp in the Adirondack region

==== Suffolk County Council ====
Suffolk County Council (#404)
- Owner: Boy Scouts of America
- Headquarters: Medford, NY
- Location: Suffolk County, NY
- Country: United States
- Founded: April 6, 1919
- President: Mark Businski
- Council Commissioner: Dot Young
- Scout Executive: Dirk Smith
- Website www.sccbsa.org

Suffolk County Council serves scouts in Suffolk County, on Long Island, New York. Baiting Hollow Scout Camp is the council camp.

Originally, the Huntington and Smithtown councils were founded in 1917, and both folded in 1918. In 1919, the Patchogue Council was founded, changing its name that same year to the Suffolk County Council (#404).^{[a]}

==== Theodore Roosevelt Council ====
Theodore Roosevelt Council (#386)
- Owner: Boy Scouts of America
- Headquarters: Massapequa, NY
- Country: United States
- Website www.trcbsa.org

Theodore Roosevelt Council supports Scouting in Nassau County, New York.

The council was established in 1917 as the Nassau County Council (#386). Although Nassau County was the primary residence of Theodore Roosevelt, the Theodore Roosevelt name was taken by another council in Arizona.^{[a]} In 1993, that council merged with the Grand Canyon Council, freeing the name, and the Nassau County Council assumed the name Theodore Roosevelt (#386) in September 1997.

==== Twin Rivers Council ====
Twin Rivers Council (#364)
- Owner: Boy Scouts of America
- Headquarters: Albany, New York
- Country: United States
- Website trcscouting.org

Twin Rivers Council is based in Albany, New York. It serves a large geographic area that encompasses thirteen counties of Northeastern New York. Twin Rivers was originally created in 1991 by a merger of the former Governor Clinton Council (#364) (Columbia, Rensselaer and Albany Counties), the Sir William Johnson Council (#377) (Hamilton, Fulton & Montgomery counties) and the Saratoga County Council (#684) (Saratoga County). A year later the Schenectady County Council (#399) (Schenectady County) was added after working out issues between the entities. Then in 1999, the Mohican Council (#378) (Warren and Washington counties) consolidated into the council. On February 14, 2006, the Adirondack Council (#394) (Franklin, Clinton and Essex Counties) and the Twin Rivers Council merged to form the current boundaries of the Twin Rivers Council (#364).^{[a]}

===== History =====
^{[a]}

===== Organization =====
The council has five districts.

- Fort Orange District (Albany County)
- Adirondack District (Clinton, Franklin, and Northern Essex counties)
- Mohawk District (Fulton, Hamilton, Montgomery, Schenectady Counties and the Town of Clifton Park)
- Yankee Doodle District (Columbia and Rensselaer Counties as well as the communities of Mechanicville and Stillwater)
- Turning Point District (Northern Saratoga, Washington, and Warren Counties)

===== Camps =====
====== Rotary Scout Reservation ======
Rotary Scout Reservation
- Location: Poestenkill, NY
- Coordinates: 42.705731°N 73.528133°W
- Founded: 1922
- Ranger: Joel Uline
- Camp Director: Brain Murray
- Program Director: Jack Schneider
- Website www.rsrbsa.org

RSR's totem is the Thunderbird.

Rotary Scout Reservation is a 1,300-acre (5 km^{2}) camp of the Twin Rivers Council, located in Poestenkill, New York. The original part of the camp was donated by the Troy Rotary Club in 1922. Summer camp program areas include the Trail to First Class Program, where young Scouts can work on requirements needed to earn Tenderfoot, Second Class and First Class ranks. As of the 2019 season RSR offers 45 merit badges in 9 program areas. In addition to the merit badge options, RSR offers an open schedule which allows Scouts to plan their day with a variety of outdoor experiences. The camp also offers several additional program areas designed to appeal to older Scouts, which include COPE, Mountain Biking, and Chillicothe.

The Chillicothe program at RSR offers Scouts and Leaders a look at American pioneer life in the 19th century. Scouts are encouraged to try their hand at activities such as candle making, flint and steel fire starting, blacksmithing, woodsman tools, tin-smithing, blacksmithing and more. Chillicothe is a program unique to RSR, and it is an often underutilized program. It was designed to encourage the return of older Scouts who had earned most of the merit badges offered by the camp. Prior to the 2019 Camp season it was decided that the Chillicothe program area was in need of some repair, so the area itself is currently closed and the badges that were offered have been moved to other program areas. This temporary closure is expected to be only until the New Nature Science Center Pavilion is opened, at which point any new additional donations and funding will go into the rebuilding of the Chillicothe Program area.

In 2012, RSR introduced Venturing Week, a week of resident camp for youth in the Venturing Program. In addition to various open programming opportunities, offerings included a full-week half-day COPE course, American Red Cross Wilderness First Aid, the New York State Department of Environmental Conservation Hunter Education course, and more. Since the venture program started gaining popularity in Twin Rivers Council in 2015, the venture week itself has been canceled and venture crews have been welcomed into the normal week to week program.

During the 2014 Year the camp decided to experiment with a STEM program dedicated to the last week of the season. Keeping with the style of the camp to try and only offer badges that scouts can't typically earn in a normal troop setting, the same has gone for STEM week. Past offerings have been the Robotics, Space Exploration, and Nuclear Sciences meritbadges. Each year the camp might have a different selection of "Supernova" Badges depending on available Volunteers or available skill sets of current staff members. In addition to adding merit badges during the week the camp has also offered sessions to for scouts to try and earn select BSA NOVA Awards. The Camp has also offered a few session in the past for STEM themed hobbies as well, most notable the ability for scouts to earn their Technician Ham Radio License.

====== Camp Wakpominee ======
Camp Wakpominee
- Location: Fort Ann, NY
- Founded: 1920
- Ranger: Bob McPherson

Camp Wakpominee is a 1,200-acre camp located in Fort Ann, NY. It is completely within the boundaries of the Adirondack Park, providing a base for Council trekking programs. The camp contains Sly Pond, a 42 acres (17 ha) lake.

====== Woodworth Lake Scout Reservation ======
Woodworth Lake Scout Reservation, was located in Gloversville, New York. The 1500 acre camp began operation in 1949. As of 2013, the camp has been sold to a private investor.

====== Camp Boyhaven ======
Camp Boyhaven
- Location: Middle Grove, NY
- Founded: 1924
- Defunct: 2018

Camp Boyhaven was a 300-acre camp located in Middle Grove, New York. It was founded as a Boy Scout camp in 1924 with a purchase of approximately 20 acres from the Frink family for Schenectady Council. Over the years, the camp grew to encompass most of the old Frink family farm. With the merger of Schenectady Council with Twin Rivers Council in 1991, it was converted to a Cub Scout and Webelos long term camp.

The totem of the camp is the "Toonerville Trolley," based on the trolley line that ran across the creek from the camp.

Each summer, the camp ran Cub Scout and Webelos resident and day camps. The camp program and facilities are specially designed for Cub Scouts, Webelos scouts, and their families. Lean-to cabins and indoor plumbing make the transition to overnight camping easier for Cub Scouts and Webelos Scouts. An archery range, BB gun range, vertical climbing wall, water slide, and movie night are all provided to appeal to younger Scouts who are spending their first nights away from home. As of 2017, summer camp programs are no longer being held and the camp is in the process of being sold.

The Camp was officially converted to Camp Stomping Ground (a Non-BSA Summer Camp) at the beginning of 2020.

====== Camp Bedford ======
Camp Bedford, is located at 10424 State Rt. 30, Malone, NY (near the Meacham Lake NYS DEC Campground, north of Paul Smiths, and south of Malone, NY). The camp encompasses 150 acres (0.61 km^{2}), 2 large ponds for boating and fishing, and over 3,500 acres (14 km^{2}) of State Wild Forests border the camp. Charles E. Bedford donated 3,650 acres (14.8 km^{2}) to the Adirondack Council in 1943 to establish the camp, making it at the time the largest donation of land to any council in the US.

===== Order of the Arrow =====
The Order of the Arrow Lodge for Twin Rivers Council is Kittan Lodge 364.

==== Western New York Council ====
Western New York Council (#380)
- Owner: Boy Scouts of America
- Headquarters: Buffalo, NY
- Founded: 2023
- Website www.wnyscouting.org

The Western New York Council was formed from the merger of the Greater Niagara Frontier Council (#380) and the Iroquois Trail Council (#376) in May 2023. Its headquarters is in Buffalo.

It serves all of Erie, Niagara, Genesee, Orleans, and Wyoming counties, and most of Livingston county.

===== History =====
Iroquois Trail Council

In 1917, the Batavia Council (#367) was formed, changing its name to the Genesee and Wyoming Counties Council (#367) in 1925, eventually changing its name to the Genesee Council (#367). In 1920, the Niagara County Council (#385) was formed, changing its name to the Lockport Area Council (#385) in 1922. In 1937, Lockport Area (#385) changed its name to the Lewiston Trail Council (#385).^{[a]} On April 20, 1943, as Scouting in Monroe County consolidated, Lewiston Trail Council received responsibility for Scouting in Orleans County.

In 1994, Genesee Council (#367) and Lewiston Trail Council (#385) merged to become the Iroquois Trail Council (#376).^{[a]}

The Iroquois Trail Council with its headquarters in Oakfield, New York, was created in 1994 from a merger of two councils.

Greater Niagara Frontier Council

In 1917, the Hamburg Council was formed, closing in 1920.

In 1912 the Buffalo Council (#373) and in 1921 the Erie County Council (#363) were formed. They merged in 1949 to form the Buffalo Area Council (#380). In 1917 the Niagara Falls Council (#387) was formed, changing its name to the Niagara Falls Area Council (#387) in 1925. In 1944, the council changed its name to the Niagara Frontier Council (#387).

In 1967 the Buffalo Area Council (#380) and the Niagara Frontier Council (#387) merged to become the Greater Niagara Frontier Council (#380).^{[a]}

The Western New York Scout Council was formed from the merger of the Greater Niagara Frontier Council (#380) and the Iroquois Trail Council (#376) in May 2023.

===== Organization =====
The council is organized into six districts:

- Nundawaga (Livingston and Wyoming Counties)
- Onondaga
- Polaris
- Red Jacket
- Seneca (eastern Orleans and Genesee Counties)
- Towpath (western Orleans and eastern Niagara Counties)

===== Camps =====
Greater Niagara Frontier Council

Camp Scouthaven is one of the five oldest Scout camps in the United States still in operation (1918 - over 100 years). It is the home of GNFC Camps Summer Programs for Cub Scouting and Scouts BSA. Situated on beautiful Crystal Lake in Freedom, NY it boasts one of the best Aquatics programs around. Scouthaven is open to year-round program as well.

Schoellkopf Scout Reservation (Sold in 2022) was formed in 1938 and is located in Cowlesville, NY. It was built through donations by the Schoellkopf family. Schoellkopf features over 650 acres of prime Scouting property. It had rustic log cabins, beautiful campsites, and newer spacious lean-to's all for year-round use.

Camp Stonehaven (Sold 2023) operated in Sanborn, NY and had accommodations including campsites, lean-to's and newer cabins. It was an ideal camp for out of town units that would like to tour Niagara Falls. (Now owned by the Town of Lewiston as a nature preserve)

Iroquois Trail Council

It had two camps: Camp Dittmer (Sold 2023) (Scouts BSA) and Camp Sam Wood (Cub Scout). Sam Wood was the first Eagle Scout in Genesee County. Sam Wood was a member of Troop 1 St. James Church, Batavia.

====== Order of the Arrow ======
- The new Erie Canal lodge #159 was formed from the merger of the Ho-De-No-Sau-Nee Lodge (#159) lodge of the Greater Niagara Frontier Council, and the Ashokwahta Lodge (#339) of the Iroquois Trail Council in 2023.

=== Girl Scouts ===
Girl Scouting in New York
- Map of Girl Scout Councils in New York State

New York state is served by eight Girl Scouts councils. In addition, the Edith Macy Conference Center belonging to the national organization is in Briarcliff Manor, and the national headquarters is in New York City.

==== National headquarters ====
The national headquarters has been in various places in New York City since 1916 when it moved there from Washington, D.C. It has been at 420 Fifth Avenue since 1992. Small groups can visit with prior reservations and visiting girls may be able to take part in a focus group meeting.

==== Edith Macy Conference Center ====
Edith Macy Conference Center is a national conference and training facility of the Girl Scouts of the USA (GSUSA) It is located in Briarcliff Manor. The site has had four names: Camp Edith Macy (C.E.M.) - University In The Woods, Edith Macy Training School, Edith Macy Girl Scout National Center and since 1982, Edith Macy Conference Center. However, it is often simply referred to as Macy. The John J. Creedon Education Center and Camp Andree Clark are part of the complex. Macy hosted the Girl Guides and Girl Scouts Fourth International Conference in 1926. Camp Andree Clark hosted the GSUSA's Silver Jubilee Camp in 1937.

==== Girl Scouts of Connecticut ====
Fishers Island in Suffolk County, New York is served by the Girl Scouts of Connecticut due to the close ties between the island and Connecticut.

==== Girl Scout Council of Greater New York ====
Girl Scout Council of Greater New York
- Owner: Girl Scouts of the USA
- Headquarters: New York, NY
- Country: United States
- Founded: 2005
- Website www.girlscoutsnyc.org

Girl Scouts of Greater New York serves some 25,000 girls and has over 8,700 volunteers in New York City.

The council camp is 353-acre (1.43 km^{2}) Camp Henry Kaufmann in Holmes, NY.

==== Girl Scouts Heart of the Hudson ====
Girl Scouts Heart of the Hudson
- Owner: Girl Scouts of the USA
- Headquarters: Pleasantville, New York
- Country: United States
- Founded: 2005
- Website www.girlscoutshh.org

Girl Scouts Heart of the Hudson serves over 34,000 girls. The council was formed through the merger of five counties: Dutchess, Rockland, Orange, Putnam and Westchester.

===== Camps =====
- Camp Addisone Boyce is 360 acres (1.5 km^{2}) in Tomkins Cove next to Harriman State Park. It was founded in 1951 and named for Dr. Addisone Boyce who had been active in finding a suitable camp.
- Camp Birch Ridge is 100 acres (0.40 km^{2}) in Otisville, New York.
- Camp Ludington is 150 acres (0.61 km^{2}) in Holmes, New York and was opened in 1954.
- Camp Wendy is 56 acres (230,000 m^{2}) (including a 13-acre (53,000 m^{2}) lake) in Wallkill, New York. It was given to the Girl Scouts of Ulster County in 1926 by the Borden family.
- Rock Hill Camp is 200 acres (0.81 km^{2}) in Mahopac, New York. It has been used by the Girl Scouts since 1922 (initially leased and then purchased in 1927).
- Rocky Brook Camp is 3 acres (12,000 m^{2}) in Eastchester, New York.

==== Girl Scouts of Nassau County ====
Girl Scouts of Nassau County
- Owner: Girl Scouts of the USA
- Headquarters: Garden City, New York
- Country: United States
- Founded: 1917
- Website www.gsnc.org

Girl Scouting In Nassau County started in 1917.It is chartered by GSUSA to develop, maintain and administer Girl Scouting in Nassau County.

===== Camps =====
Camp Blue Bay in East Hampton, New York is the council camp. Camp Tekakwitha was sold in June 2007 to Southampton, NY which will retain it as open space.

==== Girl Scouts of Northeastern New York ====
Girl Scouts of Northeastern New York
- Owner: Girl Scouts of the USA
- Headquarters: Albany, New York
- Country: United States
- Founded: 2007
- CEO: Mary Buzuwski
- Website www.girlscoutsneny.org

Girl Scouts of Northeastern New York (GSNENY) was created in June 2007 from the union of four Girl Scout Councils: Hudson Valley, Mohawk Pathways, Adirondack and North Country. GSNENY serves the following counties: Albany, Clinton, Columbia, Greene, Essex, Franklin, Fulton, Montgomery, Hamilton, Rensselaer, Saratoga, Schenectady, Schoharie, Warren, and Washington Counties; along with, a portion of St. Lawrence County. With Service Centers in Albany, Queensbury, and Plattsburgh; GSNENY serves over 10,000 girls and has more than 4,500 adults and volunteers.

===== Camps =====
Girl Scouts of Northeastern New York owns five camp properties in the Adirondack region, to include two overnight camps:

- Hidden Lake Camp is 400 acres (1.6 km^{2}) in Adirondack Park, 3 miles from Lake George Village.
- Lake Clear Camp is situated on 91 acres (370,000 m^{2}) on a peninsula, on Lake Clear, in Lake Clear, New York.
- Camp Is-Sho-Da is 100 acres (0.40 km^{2}) in East Greenbush, New York.
- Camp Meadowbrook is located in Queensbury, New York.
- Camp Wood Haven is near Galway, New York.

It features a large playing field, pond, beach, creek, hiking trails, cabins, platform tents, a nature center, and Troop House.

==== Girl Scouts of NYPENN Pathways ====
Girl Scouts of NYPENN Pathways
- Owner: Girl Scouts of the USA
- Headquarters: Garden City, New York
- Country: United States
- Founded: 2009
- Website www.gsnypenn.org

NYPenn Pathways was formed in June 2009, from five legacy councils - Seven Lakes Council, Central New York Council, Foothills Council, Indian Hills Council and Thousand Islands Council. NYPenn Pathways serves girls in 24 New York State counties and 2 Pennsylvania counties with a total girl registration totaling about 27,000.

===== History =====
NYPenn Pathway's Original Five Councils

- Central New York Council - served Cortland, Onondaga, Oswego and portions of Madison County
- Foothills Council - served Herkimer and Oneida Counties, most of Madison County and parts of Otsego, Lewis, and Hamilton counties
- Indian Hills Council - served Broome, Chenango, Delaware, parts of Otsego County
- Seven Lakes Council - the largest of the original five, served Allegany, Cayuga, Chemung, Ontario, Schuyler, Seneca, Steuben, Tioga, Tompkins, Yates and Wayne Counties; and in Pennsylvania: Bradford and Tioga Counties
- Thousand Islands Council - served Lewis, Jefferson, and St. Lawrence Counties

===== Organization =====
- Binghamton, New York
- Horseheads, New York
- New Hartford, New York
- Norwich, New York
- Oneonta, New York
- Phelps, New York
- Syracuse, New York
- Watertown, New York

===== Camps =====
- Camp Agaliha (Cherokee for 'sunshine') is a summer camp located on Camp Kingsley near Rome, New York
- Camp Amadaha (Located at Gulf Summit, N.Y. 1920–1925, relocated to Camp Arrowhead)
- Amahami Outdoor Center is 450 acres (1.8 km^{2}) including a 10-acre (40,000 m^{2}) lake near Deposit, New York
- Bayberry Program Center, near Geneva, New York
- Camp Hoover is 90 acres (360,000 m^{2}) (including an island) on Song Lake near Preble, New York
- Camp Near Wilderness near West Monroe, New York is currently closed.
- Camp Trefoil is 210 acres (0.85 km^{2}) near Harrisville, New York. It was acquired in 1949
- Comstock Program Center, on Cayuga Lake, New York
- Misty Hollow Program Center, near Corning, New York
- Sugar Creek Program Center, near Troy, Pennsylvania
- Yaiewano Program Center, on Owasco Lake, New York

==== Girl Scouts of Suffolk County ====
Girl Scouts of Suffolk County
- Owner: Girl Scouts of the USA
- Headquarters: Commack, New York
- Country: United States
- Founded: 1968
- Website www.gssc.us

Girl Scouts of Suffolk County serves more than 43,000 girls and has more than 9,000 adult volunteers. The first troop in the county was started in 1915.

===== Camps =====
- Camp Edey is 95 acres (380,000 m^{2}) in Bayport, New York
- Camp Sobaco is 34 acres (140,000 m^{2}) in Yaphank, New York

==== Girl Scouts of Western New York ====
Girl Scouts of Western New York
- Owner: Girl Scouts of the USA
- Headquarters: Buffalo, New York
- Country: United States
- Founded: 2008
- Website www.gswny.org

Girl Scouts of Western New York was created on July 1, 2008, from legacy councils: Girl Scout Council of Buffalo & Erie County, Inc., Girl Scouts of Genesee Valley, Inc., Girl Scouts of Niagara County, Inc., Chautauqua Area Girl Scout Council, Inc., and Girl Scouts of Southwestern New York, Inc. The council serves some 15,000 girls within Erie, Chautauqua, Cattaraugus, Genesee, Livingston, Niagara, Orleans, Monroe, and Wyoming counties.

===== Camps =====
- Camp Piperwood in Perinton, New York
- Camp Windy Meadows in Lockport, New York is 39 acres (160,000 m^{2}).
- Camp Seven Hills in Holland, New York is 620 acres (2.5 km^{2}) including two lakes.
- Camp Timbercrest in Randolph, New York is 900 acres (3.6 km^{2}) including a 31-acre (130,000 m^{2}) lake.

=== Baden-Powell Service Association ===
In recent years, New York has also been home to smaller, independent scouting organizations.

New York is home to six chartered groups of the Baden-Powell Service Association. The BPSA is an inclusive, "Traditional Scouting" organization that welcomes boys and girls, men and women from 5 years of age through adulthood, "regardless of race, gender identity, sexual orientation, class, ability, religion (or no religion), or other differentiating factors".

=== International Scouting units ===
In addition, there are Armenian Scouts and Estonian Scouts in Exile in New York City, and Külföldi Magyar Cserkészszövetség Hungarian Scouting maintains two troops in New York City and one in Buffalo. Also, there are large contingents of active Plast Ukrainian Scouts in New York City.

=== West Point Camporee ===
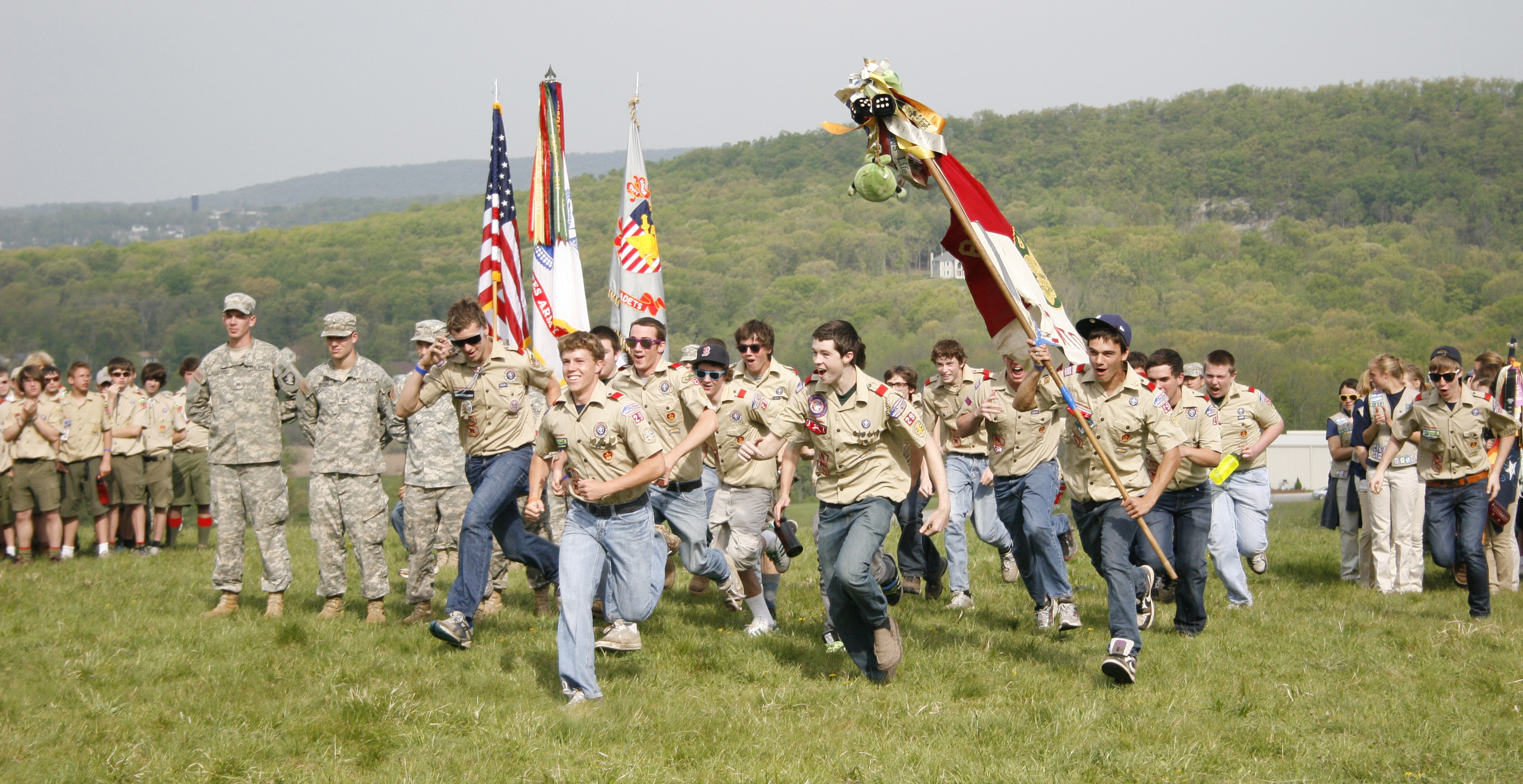
48th annual West Point Camporee

The West Point Camporee annual Invitational event, started in 1963, run by a Cadet Officer, held around the first week of May since 2001 on the grounds of Lake Frederick. Cadets are allowed to invite their home Scouting Units. Managed by the Scoutmasters' Council.

== Scouting museums ==
- Camp Boyhaven Scouting Museum, Middle Grove, New York
- Ten Mile River Scout Museum, Narrowsburg, New York
- William Hillcourt Scout Museum and Carson Buck Memorial Library named for William Hillcourt, and Carson Buck, Constantia, New York

== See also ==
- Scouting in Ontario
- Scouting in Québec
- Knickerbocker Greys
- John J. Creedon Education Center
- Girl Scouts Troop 6000
