= Allegheny Highlands =

Allegheny Highlands may refer to:

- Allegheny Mountains
- Allegheny Highlands Council
