= Delaware County Council =

Delaware County Council may be:

- The governing body of Delaware County, Pennsylvania
- Delaware County Council (New York), a defunct council of the Boy Scouts of America
- Delaware County Council (Indiana), a defunct council of the Boy Scouts of America
