= Lawrence Israel Prize =

Architecture award

The Lawrence Israel Prize is awarded by the Interior Design Program of the Fashion Institute of Technology (FIT), New York City. The prize was named for and endowed by the architect Lawrence J. Israel.

The prize was first awarded in 1998 and has been bestowed annually since "to an individual or firm whose ideas and work enrich FIT Interior Design students’ course of study". Every year the award winners are invited to give a public talk at FIT. FIT has recognized Johannes Knoops with a faculty award for "...refreshing the Lawrence Israel Prize Lecture".

== Recipients ==
- 1998 – Charles Gwathmey
- 1999 – John F. Saladino
- 2000 – Margo Grant Walsh
- 2001 – Clodagh
- 2002 – Billie Tsien
- 2003 – Vicente Wolf
- 2004 – Bromley/Caldari
- 2005 – Adam D. Tihany
- 2006 – Jamie Drake
- 2007 – Lindy Roy
- 2008 – AvroKO
- 2009 – Gaetano Pesce
- 2010 – LTL
- 2011 – David Rockwell
- 2012 – Diller Scofidio + Renfro
- 2013 – Roman and Williams
- 2014 – LOT-EK
- 2015 – Tony Chi
- 2016 – SHoP Architects
- 2017 – Karim Rashid
- 2018 – Annabelle Selldorf
- 2019 – Alexandra Champalimaud
- 2023 - Joel Sanders
