= Girl Scouts Troop 6000 =

New York Girl Scout Troop for shelter inhabitants

Troop 6000 is a Girl Scouts troop for girls in the New York City shelter system. It was founded by Giselle Burgess and Jimmy Van Bramer in 2017, and initially served about 20 scouts; it has since expanded to include more than 600 girls and volunteers at over 18 shelters in New York City.

== History ==
Troop 6000 was founded as a result of suggestions from Jimmy Van Bramer, a New York City Councilmember, and Giselle Burgess, a community engagement specialist for Girl Scouts of Greater New York, who was living in a homeless shelter with her children at the time. The proposal was met with enthusiastic support by the Girl Scouts organization. Initially, it was based at the shelter in Long Island City where Burgess was living (in the district represented by Van Bramer). By 2019, it had expanded to serve more than 600 girls and women volunteers at 18 shelters city-wide.

The troop has inspired other Girl Scouts troops serving girls in housing insecure situations, such as Troop 64224 in Council Bluffs, Iowa.

== Activities ==
The troop participates in a similar variety of activities and programs as other Girl Scouts do, including exposure to Science, Technology, Engineering, and Math fields, studying first aid, and camping. Troop 6000 also sells cookies; in 2018, the Kellogg’s Cafe in Union Square provided space for a stand.

Since its founding, the program has expanded to include more than 600 girls and volunteers at over 18 shelters in New York City. The program offer the girls fun, new skills, and a refuge from the outside world.

== See also ==
- Homelessness services
