= Massawepie Mire =

Coordinates: 44.2437°N 74.6543°W

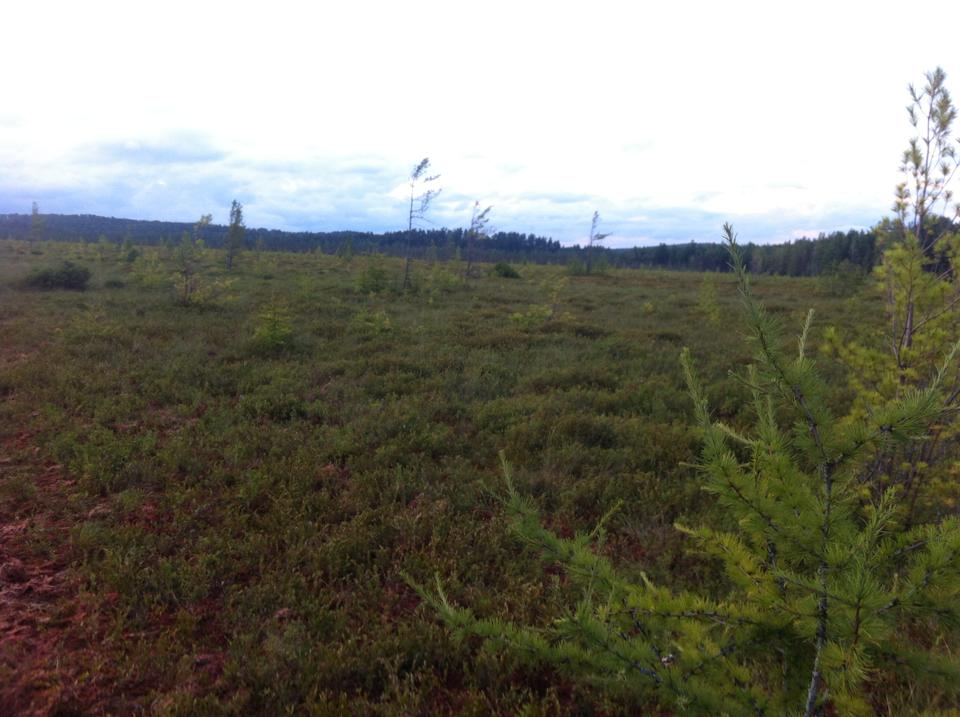
The Massawepie Mire, the largest bog in New York State

The Massawepie Mire is a boreal peatland bog in Piercefield, New York, located near Massawepie Lake. Covering an area of over 900 acres, the mire is the largest bog in New York State. This large size is due to its position in a large, shallow glacial basin.

== Background ==
Much of the bog is on the property of Massawepie Scout Camps, and the camp partners with the Nature Conservancy to preserve the ecosystem. The Massawepie Mire is noted for birdwatching, with several species of rare birds occupying the area including spruce grouse, Canada jay, Lincoln's sparrow, boreal chickadee, and the two-barred crossbill. Flora includes the carnivorous pitcher plants and sundew, tamarack pines and black spruce trees, as well as the sphagnum moss that makes up the base of the bog.
