= Greater New York Councils =

Scouting America local council

Greater New York Councils (#640)
- CSP of Greater New York
- Owner: Scouting America
- Location: 155 East 56th Street, Second Floor New York, NY 10022
- Country: United States
- Council President: Richard G. Mason
- Council Commissioner: James Delorey
- Chief Executive Officer: Saroya Friedman-Gonzalez
- Website

The Greater New York Councils (GNYC) is a local council of Scouting America that serves the New York City area. GNYC has a unique organization in that it is sub-divided into boroughs, each of which is led by a borough executive. The boroughs are then divided into districts, and over five million young people have experienced Scouting through GNYC, since the council's inception in the 1920s.

The programs of the Scouting America aim to serve young people by encouraging healthy habits and a lifelong appreciation of physical and personal fitness, replacing bullying with kindness, instilling a sense of environmental stewardship and sustainability, and providing leadership development opportunities and STEM Education, preparing young people for the workforce. The mission of the Scouting America is to prepare young people to make ethical and moral choices over their lifetimes by instilling in them the values of the Scout Oath and Law.

== History ==
In 1915, the Greater New York Advisory Council was founded, changing its name to the Boy Scout Federation of Greater New York Council (#719) in 1925. In 1936 the council changed its name to the Greater New York Council (#719). Since the beginning, the five boroughs of the city each maintained their own council under the umbrella of the "greater" council Bronx Council (#372), Brooklyn Council (#369), Manhattan Council (#384), Queens Council(#371), and the Staten Island Council (#396).

In 1967, the council was renumbered as Greater New York Council (#640) with each of the boroughs also being renumbered: Bronx Council (#641), Brooklyn Council (#642), Manhattan Council (#643), Queens Council(#644), and the Staten Island Council (#645).

The Greater New York Councils office relocated from the Empire State Building to 475 Riverside Drive in Morningside Heights in December 2018.

== Organization ==
The name of Greater New York Councils is written in plural form, because the five borough councils that composed it were themselves councils and operate as such in many respects. Each had its own BSA council number, a council president and a council commissioner. Each selects recipients of the Silver Beaver award and presents these along with other council-level awards annually. Until 2013, each borough council had its own Order of the Arrow lodge. Those who are registered as youth or adult participants with borough councils wear borough council shoulder patches on their uniforms. This has been permitted by BSA uniforming rules, because each of the boroughs had been technically a local council in its own right.

=== Bronx Borough ===
Bronx Borough

- Bronx River District (as of 2007–2008)

OA Chapter - Uteney Gohkos

Formerly:

- Eastern District
- New Horizon District
- Frontier District

=== Brooklyn Borough ===
Brooklyn Borough

- Breukelen District
- Lenape Bay District

OA Chapter - Shu-Shu-Gah

=== Manhattan Borough ===
Manhattan Borough

- Big Apple District

OA Chapter - Man-A-Hattin

=== Queens Borough ===
Queens Borough

- Founders District
- Trailblazer District

OA Chapters - Matinecock (Founders District) & Mespaetch (Pathfinder/Tomahawk District)

=== Staten Island Borough ===
Staten Island Borough

- Aquehonga District

OA Chapter – Aquehonga

== Camps ==
The council currently operates and maintains three year round Scout camp properties: William H. Pouch Scout Camp, Alpine Scout Camp, and Ten Mile River Scout Reservation.

=== Ten Mile River Scout Camps ===
Ten Mile River Scout Camps
- Location: Narrowsburg, New York
- Coordinates: 41.575997°N 74.951227°W
- Founded: 1927
- Website www.tenmileriver.org

Ten Mile River Scout Camps (TMR) is a 12,000-acre (4,856 ha) - roughly the size of Manhattan - camp near Narrowsburg, New York, has four miles of frontage on the Delaware River, and is owned and operated by the Greater New York Councils of the Boy Scouts of America (BSA) since 1927. It is the principal Boy Scout camp serving New York City. In recent years, TMR is also now increasingly used by other councils in New York state. Over the years, prominent Americans have been instrumental in its history, including Franklin D. Roosevelt and New York mayor William O'Dwyer.

==== History ====
TMR was founded as the result of efforts by the New York City Boy Scout Foundation beginning in 1924 to develop a camp large enough to accommodate the burgeoning growth of Scouting in the New York metropolitan area during the 1920s, with a goal of providing camping for 3,500 Scouts at a time. Led by future New York governor and President of the United States Franklin Delano Roosevelt (FDR), who was president of the New York City Boy Scout Foundation, the group selected TMR's present site, oversaw the land acquisition process from multiple owners, and raised funds for the large camp's development.

In recognition of his pivotal role in the founding and development of TMR, then-Governor Roosevelt received Scouting's Silver Buffalo Award in a ceremony held at the camp on August 23, 1930. Later, as recently elected president of the U.S., FDR returned again to the camp in the summer of 1933 to be inducted into the Order of the Arrow. By the summer of 1936, 10,000 boys were attending the camp each summer, the New York Times reported.

In 1952, a Manhattan Boy Scout was recognized as the 250,000th Scout to attend TMR and given a special award by FDR's widow, Eleanor Roosevelt. At its peak in 1965, Ten Mile River operated eleven camps with a peak usage of nearly 12,000 boys. Following a decline in the 1970s, five of TMR's eleven camps closed. By the late 1990s, attendance had rebounded to 6,000 Scouts.

==== Ten Mile River Scout Camps Notable Alumni ====
- Charles Camarda, astronaut.
- Tony Curtis, actor.
- Eugene Calvin Cheatham Jr., Eagle Scout, Tuskegee Airmen.
- Jay M. Cohen, Eagle Scout, Rear Admiral US Navy.
- Andrew Cuomo, Governor.
- Harvey Finkelstein, Distinguished Eagle Scout, Inventor.
- Johnny Ford, Politician.
- James P. Gordon, Eagle Scout, physicist known for his work in the fields of optics and quantum electronics.
- Earl G. Graves Sr., publisher, philanthropist, and advocate of African-American businesses.
- Johannes Knoops, Eagle Scout, Rome Prize Fellow in Architecture and noted educator.
- Bernie Sanders, U.S. Senator and Presidential candidate.

==== Present ====
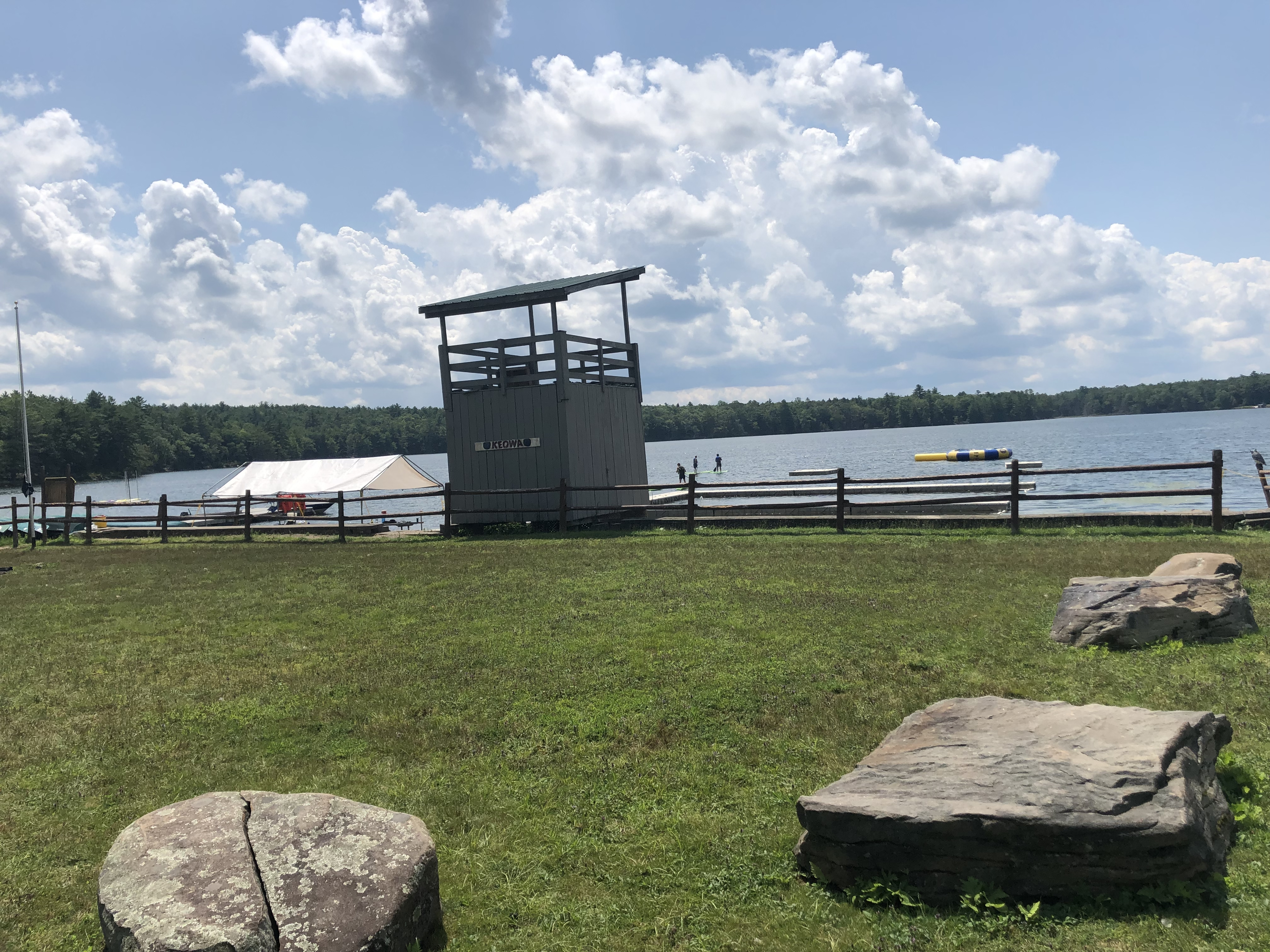
Waterfront at Camp Keowa on Crystal Lake

TMR is heavily wooded with hills overlooking the Delaware River. It has 10 lakes and ponds, including Half Moon, Crystal, Nianque, Turnpike, and Rock, for boating, swimming, sailing, canoeing, rowing, kayaking and other aquatic activities, as well as an Olympic size pool. In addition to specialty camps such as Aviation Camp, National Youth Leader Training, Trail to Eagle Camp, Shooting Sports Camp, and Aquatics Camp, TMR has a central headquarters area, a state-of-the-art outdoor amphitheater, a high ropes team-building course, three climbing towers, an ATV program, horseback riding, sports complex, family camp, and three active youth camps, each offering different programs and activities:

- Camp Aquehonga on Half Moon Lake, with traditional Scout camping including patrol cooking, along with an olympic-sized swimming pool.
- Camp Keowa on Crystal Lake, offers water activities such as canoeing, sailing and waterskiing, with meals served dining hall-style. Near Bethel, New York
- Camp Ranachqua(temporarily closed for Scouts BSA camping in 2023) on Lake Nianque, with meals served dining hall-style. This is the principal Boy Scout camp serving the Hudson Valley Council.

==== Closed TMR camps ====
Crystal Lake

- Camp Kernochan
- Camp Lakeside
- Camp Manhattan
- Camp Man
- Camp Rondack

Lake Nianque

- Camp Nianque: Once the kosher meals camp for TMR until its closure, it was located about one-third mile North of Stillwaters/Ranachqua on the east side of the lake
- Camp Stillwaters underwent a name change to Camp Ranachqua by the end of the 1950s. Located near the south end of Lake Nianque, Stillwaters was the traditional camp for troops from the Bronx. The Bronx OA Lodge #4 was called Ranachqua until the merger of the five Greater New York Councils lodges.

Davis Lake

- Camp Davis Lake
- Camp Hayden (formerly Davis Lake West)

Rock Lake

- Camp Chappegat
- Camp Ihpetonga
- Camp Kotohke
- Camp Kunatah - Camp Kunatah was also utilized by Kosher Observant troops from mostly Brooklyn, but also from New Jersey, Massachusetts, Maryland and Virginia for 1/2 summers. At the end of the summer (weeks 4–7) traditional camp would take place with troops from all over. Explorer Camp was held for many years in Week 8.
- Camp Brooklyn

=== Alpine Scout Camp ===
Greater New York Councils also operates Alpine Scout Camp, located in Alpine, New Jersey. The camp is used for short-term wilderness camping, as well as long-term platform tent camping. Various activity areas include orienteering courses, an indoor climbing wall, an outdoor climbing tower, archery range, BB range, a pool, an activity center with indoor games, as well as a network of trails.

"Cub World" includes a representation of a Wild West frontier fort and a large "land ship" used for many youth activities. 2024's Summer Camp Theme was Knights and Dragons.

During the summer, "Cub World" offers week-long over night camping experiences for 6- to 10-year-old boys and girls. Kimama, Camp Gan Israel and Alpine Day Camp are three of the Day Camps hosted on the Property. They experience most of what a Cub Scout would experience during a week of camp without an overnight stay.

Alpine Scout Camp is host to the majority of GNYC's off season events such as Outdoor Skills Days, Winter Camp, Family Fun Weekends and Cub Day Activities.

=== William H. Pouch Scout Camp ===
Greater New York Councils also operates William H. Pouch Scout Camp, located in the Greenbelt Trail on Staten Island, New York. William H. Pouch Scout Camp, located in Staten Island, is New York City's only Scout Camp. Pouch Camp is open year-round for Scouting activities. The camp is approximately 143 acres, including several cabins with capacity to hold 14 to 22 Scouts and Scouters. The camp also includes 55 leantos, 20 tent sites, and a low-impact Camp-O-Ree field with an adjacent amphitheater. There are numerous Picnic Groves as well as a Chapel. GNYC operates a summer day camp designed especially for Cub Scouts drawn from the surrounding communities.

== Order of the Arrow ==
Kintecoying Lodge #4
- Lodge Chief: Fiona Greaney
- Advisor: J. Michael O'Brien
- Staff Advisor: Mychael Morrell

In 2013, the Greater New York Councils merged each of the five boroughs' Order of the Arrow Lodges (Ranachqua #4, Shu-Shu-Gah #24, Man-a-Hattin #82, Suanhacky #49 and Aquehongian Lodge #112) and formed Kintecoying Lodge #4 - the new Order of the Arrow Lodge for the Greater New York Councils, BSA.

Kintecoying Lodge #4 can be found online on Facebook, Instagram and Twitter.

As of February 2018, Former Lodge Vice Chief of Inductions, Former 2 terms Lodge Chief and Vigil Member from The Bronx, Brian Byrne. Byrne also serves in the GNYC's Venturing Officers' Association as its VP-Administration and is the Former Youth Representative of GNYC Boy Scouts for Ethan Draddy.

As of July 2022, Finley Bartkowski, brotherhood member from Aquehonga Chapter became the 10th Lodge Chief of Kintecoying Lodge. Finley formerly served as the Lodge Vice-Chief of Inductions for the 2021–2022 term and Aquehonga Chapter Vice-Chief for the 2020–2021 term. As of June 2023, Finley became the Section E18 Vice-Chief, for the 2023–2024 term.

=== History ===
For over 100 years the Order of the Arrow has played a significant role in the life of millions of Scouts, shaping them to be young men dedicated to the service of others and bound in brotherhood to fellow men.{{Citation needed|date=July 2026}}

Soon after Dr. E. Urner Goodman and Col. Carol A. Edson founded our Order at Treasure Island Scout Camp in 1915, word of the Wimachtendienk came to New York City. In 1920, four men were inducted into the Order and formed the 4th Order of the Arrow Lodge in the country. It was on that evening that the history of, what we now know as the Greater New York Councils began.

For 93 years, the Greater New York Councils chartered 5 lodges, one in each borough. Ranachqua Lodge #4 was founded in 1920 and served the Bronx. Shu-Shu-Gah Lodge #24 was founded in 1925 and served Brooklyn. Suanhacky Lodge #49 was founded in 1930 and served Queens. Man-A-Hattin Lodge #82 was founded in 1935 and served Manhattan. Aquehongian Lodge #112 was founded in 1938 and served Staten Island.

=== Lodge merger of 2013 ===
On August 30, 2012, after careful consideration over the course of many months, former Scout Executive Charles Rosser (1954-2014) announced the decision that combining the council's five Order of the Arrow lodges into a single lodge will allow the OA to better fulfill the Mission of the Lodge and the Purpose of the Order of the Arrow. A committee of ten youth and 7 adults were tasked with transitioning the OA in the Greater New York Councils.

Members of the transition team were: Representing Ranachqua Lodge, Brenden DelBene (Lodge Chief), Matthew Thomas and Marc Messenger (Lodge Adviser). Representing Shu-Shu-Gah Lodge, Robert Rowley (Lodge Chief), Nicholas Goldrosen, and Anthony Bracciante (Lodge Adviser). Representing Suanhacky Lodge, Anthony Lectora (Lodge Chief), Andrew Sommer, and Michael Lectora (Adviser). Representing Man-A-Hattin Lodge, Alan Tang (Lodge Chief), Brendan Looi, and Michael O’Brien (Lodge Adviser). Representing Aquehongian Lodge, Allan Feldman (Lodge Chief), Christopher Sorensen, and John Perchiacca (Lodge Adviser). Lodge Staff Adviser Christopher Coscia, and Lodge Adviser Designate Colin Pinnavaia rounded out the committee.

The team met nine times between the fall of 2012 and the spring of 2013 to discuss how the lodge would be organized, the lodge name and totem, lodge committees, and chapter organization among other topics.

The Peregrine Falcon Lodge name of Kintecoying comes from several modern day sources which claim that what we now know as Astor Place used to be named Kintecoying or, “Crossroads of Nations,” and was a pow-wow point for the Lenape tribes of Manhattan. At this spot, where the branches of the trails converged, the Lenapes traded with each other, exchanged news, and held spiritual ceremonies and tribal councils to settle disputes. The “Crossroads of Nations” also speaks to New York City's role as the “Capital of the World” and a “Melting Pot” of peoples from many lands from around the globe. Although the national OA organization has stopped using lodge numbers to identify lodges, we believed that the tenure of service of the Order to our council is unique. In order to acknowledge the 93 years of Order of the Arrow history in New York City, the lodge decided to retain the use of the lodge number 4 - the first lodge number for Greater New York Councils.

The Peregrine Falcon was selected as the totem of Kintecoying Lodge. A native bird to New York City, the peregrine falcon is a symbol of strength, adventure, leadership and new beginnings. Peregrine Falcons are among the most common birds of prey and live on all continents except Antarctica. They prefer wide-open spaces, and thrive near coasts where shorebirds are common, but they can be found everywhere from tundra to deserts. Peregrines are also found living on the bridges and skyscrapers. Having been put on the endangered species list in the 1970s the peregrine falcon is making a comeback with Day One Event Logo population numbers on the rise worldwide.

The transition team decided that an inaugural lodge-wide fellowship event would be held in April 2013 to bring the GNYC OA Membership together and to officially form the new lodge. Kintecoying Lodge Day One was held on April 13, 2013, at Alpine Scout Camp. Brothers from across the city gathered to enjoy a day of fellowship, elect new lodge officers, and establish Kintecoying Lodge #4.

==== Founding officers ====
The first lodge executive committee was elected in the afternoon. Nicholas Goldrosen was elected Lodge Chief, Andrew Sommer was elected Vice-Chief of Inductions, James Maxham was elected Vice-Chief of Administration, Kirwin Seger was elected Secretary, and Patrick Machado was elected Treasurer.

=== Chapters ===
Chapters were formed to administer the OA program in the local communities. Six chapters were formed. Uteney Gokhos Chapter for the Bronx River District, Shu-Shu-Gah Chapter for Breukelen and Lenape Bay Districts, Man-a-Hattin Chapter for the Big Apple District, Aquehonga Chapter for Aquehonga District, Mespaetch Chapter for Pathfinder and Tomahawk Districts, and Matinecock Chapter for Founders District.

=== Events hosted ===
On the weekend of June 7–9, 2013, Kintecoying served as the service lodge for the 2013 Section NE-2B Conclave held at Camp Keowa at Ten Mile River. In June 2017, the lodge would go back to hosting the Section NE-2B Conclave held at Camp Keowa, Ten Mile River Scout Reservation, in Narrowsburg, New York.

== Venturing Officers Association ==
GNYC Venturing Officers Association
- Founders: Christopher Padilla, Joseph Nadal, Brian Byrne, Paul McKenna, Ethan Draddy and Joseph Schilitz
- President: Paul McKenna
- Advisor: Kylee Barnes
- Staff Advisor: Sara Rossman

In August 2017, the Greater New York Councils formally began efforts to start a Venturing Officers Association. Under the guidance of Scout Executive Ethan Draddy, four young OA brothers began the GNYC's first functioning CVOA.

Prior to its creation, the VOA's predecessors were the officers and advisers of the Queens Council VOA. At the time, the borough of Queens had the only functioning VOA in the city. The majority of crews in GNYC is held by Queens and has only ever been seconded by the Borough of Staten Island.

=== Steering Committee ===
Eagle Scout Christopher Padilla, 20 years of age at the time, caught on to the idea of a GNYC-VOA following a brief conversation with 2017 National Venturing Vice President Cathie Seebauer at the 2017 National Scout Jamboree.

While there, he attempted to enlist the help of fellow jamboree participants from the councils' scouting ranks. After looking for potential candidates, Padilla chose Brian Bryne and Paul Mckenna from The Bronx, Joseph Nadal and Jeremy Duenas from Staten Island, Jerremy Aguilar, Justin Lau and Patrick Machado from Queens, with Kirwin Seger from Brooklyn to serve on the Steering Committee.

Padilla was formally recognized as its chair with Joseph Nadal as its Vice Chair. Assistant Director of Field Service, Joseph Schlitz was appointed to serve as acting Staff Adviser.

==== Meetings ====
The committee held its initial meeting on the last night of the Jamboree at Basecamp Foxtrot's Headquarters Tent in the easternmost end of The Summit Bechtel Family National Scout Reserve. Among those in attendance, 2017 Regional Venturing President Ripley Price was supporting the conversation and planning process. The committee met a total of four times (twice in person, twice via conference call) before formally proposing the creation of the CVOA to the Council Staff.

In August 2017, Padilla and Nadal met with then-assistant field service director Joseph Schlitz and Council Executive Ethan Draddy to discuss the creation. The meeting was held at the council office in the Empire State Building. Following that meeting, the GNYC VOA was formally authorized to operate in the council.

=== Leadership ===
The VOA's first officers were appointed by Scout Executive Ethan Draddy. They were as follows, Christopher Fuentes-Padilla from Queens, the former Steering Committee Chair and Eagle Scout, serving as president. Joseph Nadal from Staten Island, who served as the Steering Committee's Vice Chair, serving as Vice President (Program). Brian Byrne from the Bronx, a Kintecoying Lodge officer and current scout, serving as Vice President (Administration).

Kirwin Seger, the former GNYC lodge chief and current OA NE-2B Vice Chief, from Brooklyn was appointed to serve as Vice President of Communications in the weeks following the initial appointments. Following the officer appointments, Gregory Hofer, an avid Venturer from Queens, and Genesis Rodriguez from the Bronx were appointed as the VOA's volunteer and staff advisers respectively.

After bring appointed, the officers formed committees and began advocating for the creation of new Venturing crews in Manhattan, the Bronx and Brooklyn. These boroughs became priorities because of the lack of a Venturing presence in those districts at the time.

Paul McKenna would later take over as president after Christopher Padilla step down in August 2020.

== Gallery ==
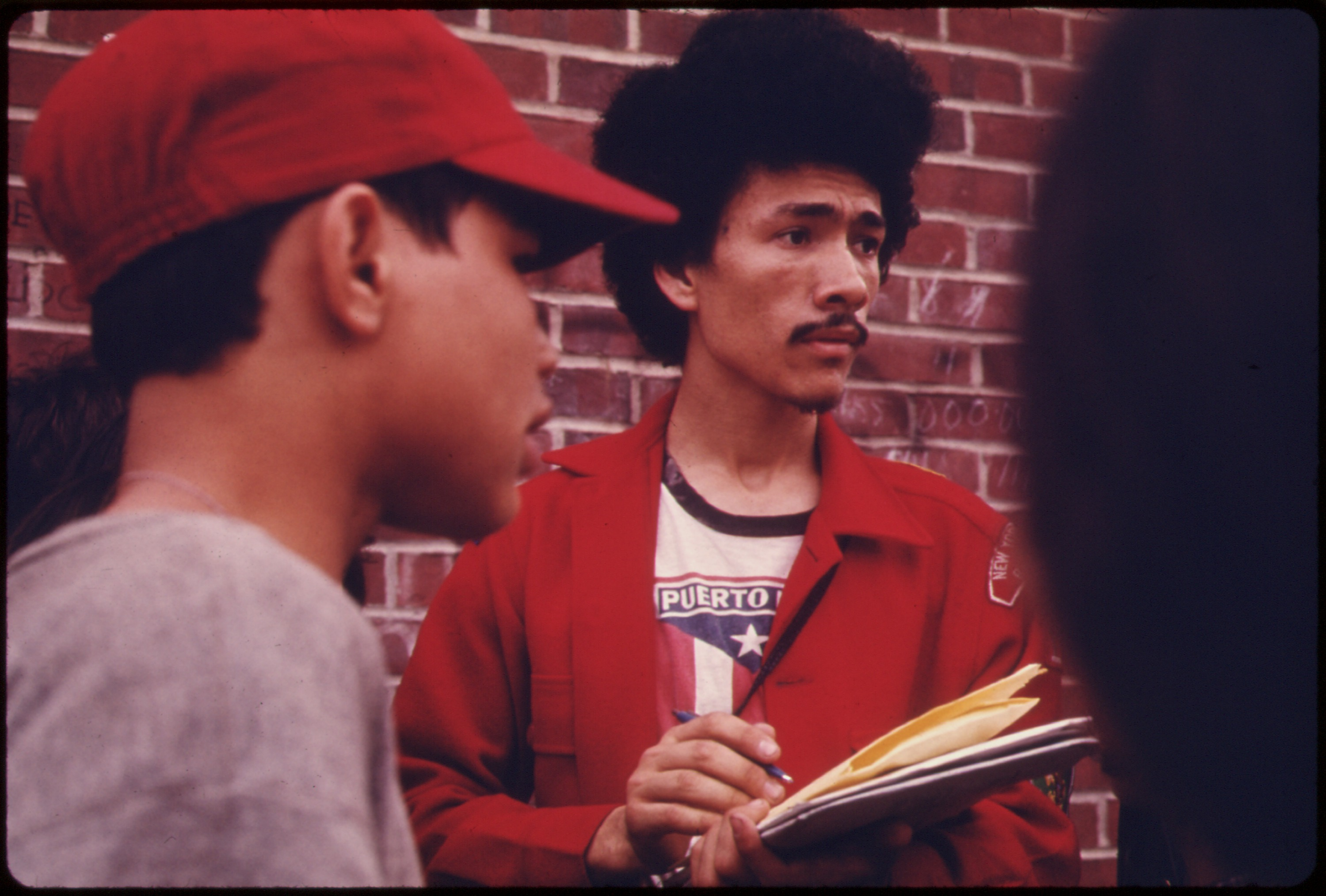
1974 - Boy Scout leader recruiting Latino youth in Bedford-Stuyvesant district of Brooklyn

== See also ==
- Scouting in New York
