= Johannes Knoops =

American architect

Johannes M. P. Knoops is an American architect, international architectural correspondent, and Professor in the Department of Interior Design at the Fashion Institute of Technology / State University of New York in New York City. Knoops' design for a private study in the tradition of a Japanese scholar's study as influenced by origami was written about in New York Magazine and his design for a new wedding chapel atop the New York Municipal Building by Architectural Scholar.

An alumnus of the Yale School of Architecture, Knoops is a 2000 recipient of the Rome Prize in architecture. At F.I.T. he has been recognized with a faculty award for "rewriting (his) department's cirriculum and refreshing the Lawrence Israel Prize Lecture". In 2018 F.I.T. honored him with the SUNY Chancellor's Award for excellence in scholarship and creative activities.

Knoops work "Venice Re-Mapped" was included in the exhibition "Time Space Existence" at the Palazzo Mora, a collateral exhibit of the 2016 edition of the Venice Biennale of Architecture. In 2018 as part of DESIGN.VE Knoops work was included in the exhibition "Design after Darwin" at the Palazzo Morosini, curated by Luca Berta, Francesca Giubilei, and Alice Stori.

He is an Eagle Scout in the Boy Scouts of America and served on staff at Ten Mile River Scout Camps, Camp Aquehonga. Most recently Knoops was engaged in researching and establishing the correct location of Aldus Pius Manutius' printing press from circa 1500 AD in the Campo San Augustino in Venice, work he completed while on a residency at Branca Center of the Giorgio Cini Foundation the Island of San Giorgio Maggiore in the Venetian lagoon. In 2018, Damocle Edizioni issued a limited edition book by Knoops, "In Search of Aldus Pius Manutius" on his research establishing the actual site of this historically significant early printing press.
