= Leatherstocking Council =

Boy Scouts of America council in New York, U.S.

Leatherstocking Council (#400)
- Owner: Boy Scouts of America
- Headquarters: Utica, New York
- Country: United States
- Founded: 2016
- Website leatherstockingcouncil.org

Leatherstocking Council is the Boy Scouts of America council which serves Herkimer, Oneida, Schoharie, and Madison counties as well as part of Hamilton, Otsego, Delaware and Lewis counties in the state of New York.

== History ==
In 1928 the Oneonta Council (#393) was formed, changing its name to the Otsego and Schoharie Counties Council (#393) in 1924. Otsego and Schoharie Counties changed its name to the Otsego-Schoharie Area Council (#393) in 1925.^{[a]}

In 1924 the Delaware County Council (#407) was formed. Delaware County merged into Otsego-Schoharie (#393) in 1926. In 1927 Otsego-Schoharie (#393) changed its name to OtSchoDela Council (#393) in 1927.^{[a]}

In 1922 the Oneida Council (#389) was formed changing its name to the Madison County Council (#389) in 1923.^{[a]}

In 1916 the Rome Council (#398) was formed. In 1919 the Sherrill Council (#400) was formed, merging into the Rome Council in 1925. In 1929, the Rome Council changed its name to the Fort Stanwix Council (#398) in 1929.^{[a]}

In 1915 the Utica Council (#406) was formed changing its name to the Upper Mohawk Council (#406) in 1937.^{[a]}

In 1968 the Madison County (#389) and Fort Stanwix (#398) councils merged to become the Iroquois Council (#395). In 1981, the Iroquois (#395) and Upper Mohawk (#406) councils merged to become the Land of the Oneidas Council (#395).^{[a]}

The first Herkimer County Council was formed in 1919, merging into the Utica Council (#406). In 1928 the Herkimer County Council (#400) was formed, changing its name to the General Herkimer Council (#400) in 1934.^{[a]}

In 2001, the Land of the Oneidas (#395) and General Herkimer (#400) councils merged, forming the Revolutionary Trails Council.^{[a]} In 2016, the Revolutionary Trails and Otschodela Councils (#393) merged to form the Leatherstocking Council (#400).

== Organization ==
The current council is divided into three districts:

- Powderhorn District
- Adirondack District
- Susquehanna Headwaters District

== Camps ==
Camp Kingsley

The Leatherstocking Council owns and operates Camp Kingsley in Ava, NY for its summer Cub Scout program and off season camping by Scouts.

Henderson Scout Reservation

Through 2021, Henderson Scout Reservation, in Maryland NY, was the scout summer camp for the Council. In March 2022, the Council announced the camp would be closed and sold. The camp had opened in 1948 when the Otschodela Council BSA moved from a location on Otsego Lake to Crumhorn Mountain. In 2022, the Council announced that it had partnered with Seneca Waterways Council, headquartered in Rochester NY, to have Massawepie Scout Camp, Tupper Lake, NY, be Leatherstocking Council's Scouts BSA summer camp provider.

Camp Russell

Opened in 1918 on White Lake, Woodhall NY, Camp Russell was operated jointly by the General Herkermer Council and the Upper Mohawk Council of Utica NY. In 1939 General Herkimer Council became the sole operator. Frank DiVito served on the camp staff from 1927 to 1999. The camp closed after the 2015 camping season and was sold two years later.

Cedarlands Scout Reservation

The Upper Mohawk Council acquired 5,500 acres in the Adirondack Town of Long Lake in 1964. In 2002, the Council sold to New York State, for $2.3M (USD), an easement for off season recreational use of the property, called the Cedarlands Conservation Easement Tract. Cedarlands was closed as a Scout summer camp in 2012. The property was listed for sale in 2015, but due in part to the conservation easement had not yet been sold as of early 2022

== Order of the Arrow ==
Ohkwaliha·Ká Lodge
- Website http://www.oalodge34.org

The Order of the Arrow is represented by the Ohkwaliha·Ká Lodge. The lodge supports the camping programs of the Revolutionary Trails Council through camp promotions, camp service weekends and positive leadership.
