= West Point Camporee =

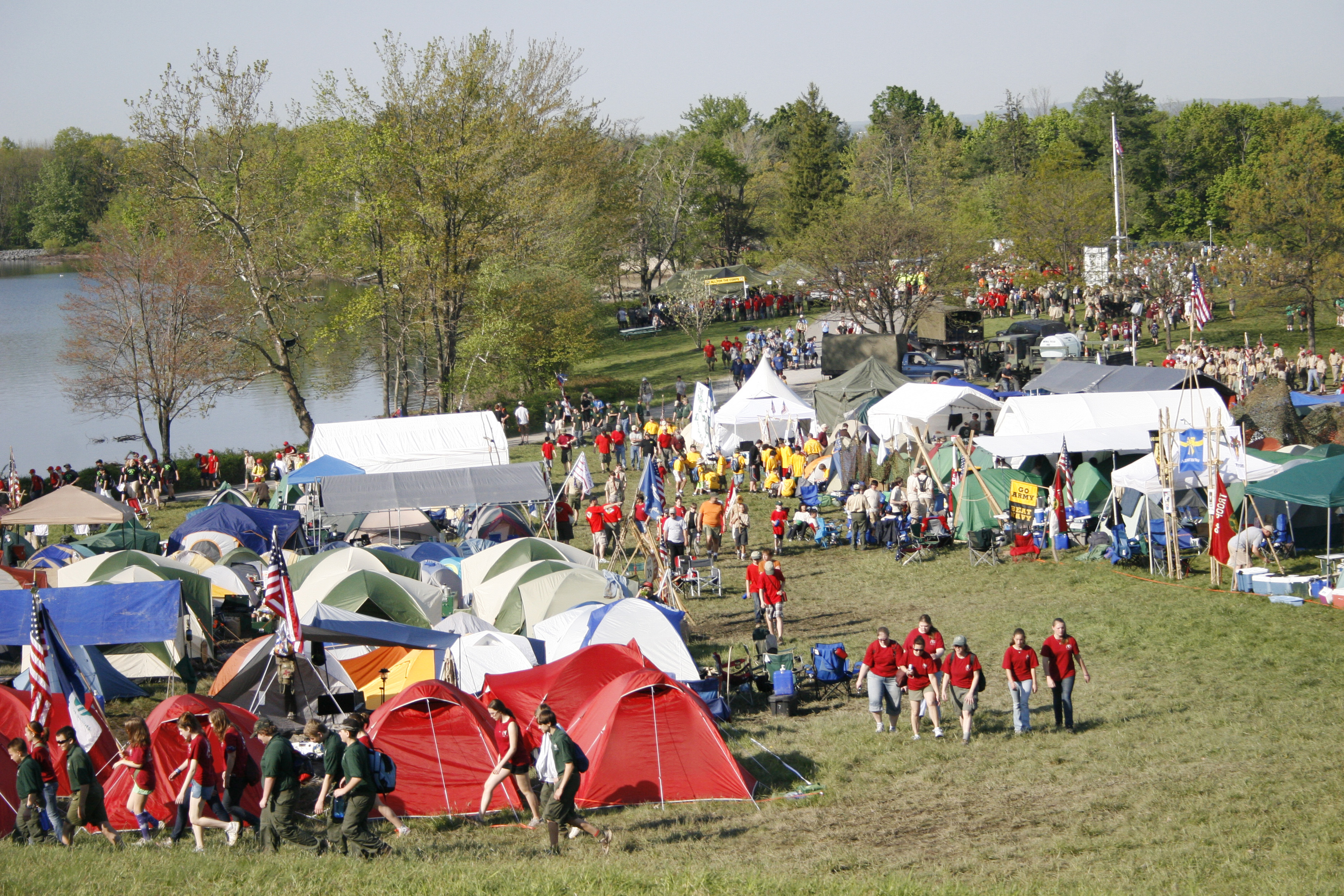
- West Point Camporee

The West Point Camporee is an annual invitational Scout camping event sponsored by the United States Military Academy at West Point, New York. It attracts Scout units from over a dozen states along the east coast of the United States, from over 75 different Scout councils. It's one of the largest annual Scouting events. The event consists of a weekend campout on the Academy property with displays, competitions, demonstrations, and a trading post. Attendees report that it is exclusively run by the Cadets.

== Organization ==
West Point Camporee is managed by a Scoutmasters' Council.

== History ==
The first Camporee was in 1961. It grew out of a discussion among cadets who attended the 1960 National Jamboree. That first camporee featured five area troops. The patch for attending was introduced at the 1963 Camporee.

Attendance was cited in the 1977 Annual Report of the Superintendent as 3,000. At least one United States Postal Service First Day Cover was issued in 1985 honoring Brigadier General Sylvanus Thayer, an early superintendent of West Point.

== Memorabilia ==
The memorabilia for the Camporee was analyzed in articles and published by Scouting Memorabilia. Commemorative objects include Troop Streamers (for attachment to the Unit Flags in 1961 and 1962), patches for uniform wear (starting 1963), neckerchiefs (starting 1970), mugs, pillows, pins, neckerchief slides, coins, t-shirts, sweatshirts, as well as "Brass", which are pins that the Cadets have.

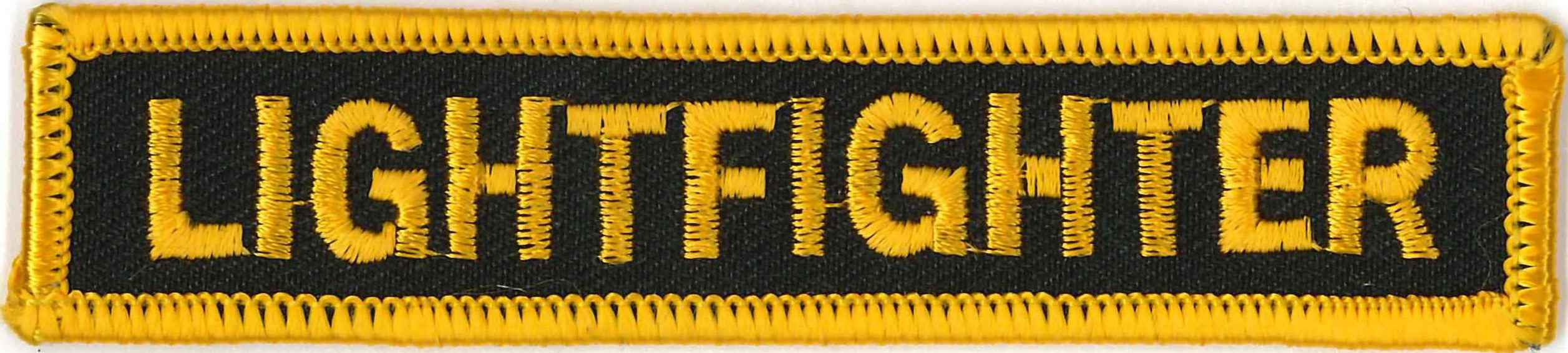
Patch issued to Scouts who have completed the hike into the Camporee over the mountain.

Mechanized troops are shuttled directly to the Camporee site and are permitted to bring one vehicle containing their gear. However they do not earn the Bull Hill pin or the Lightfighter patch.

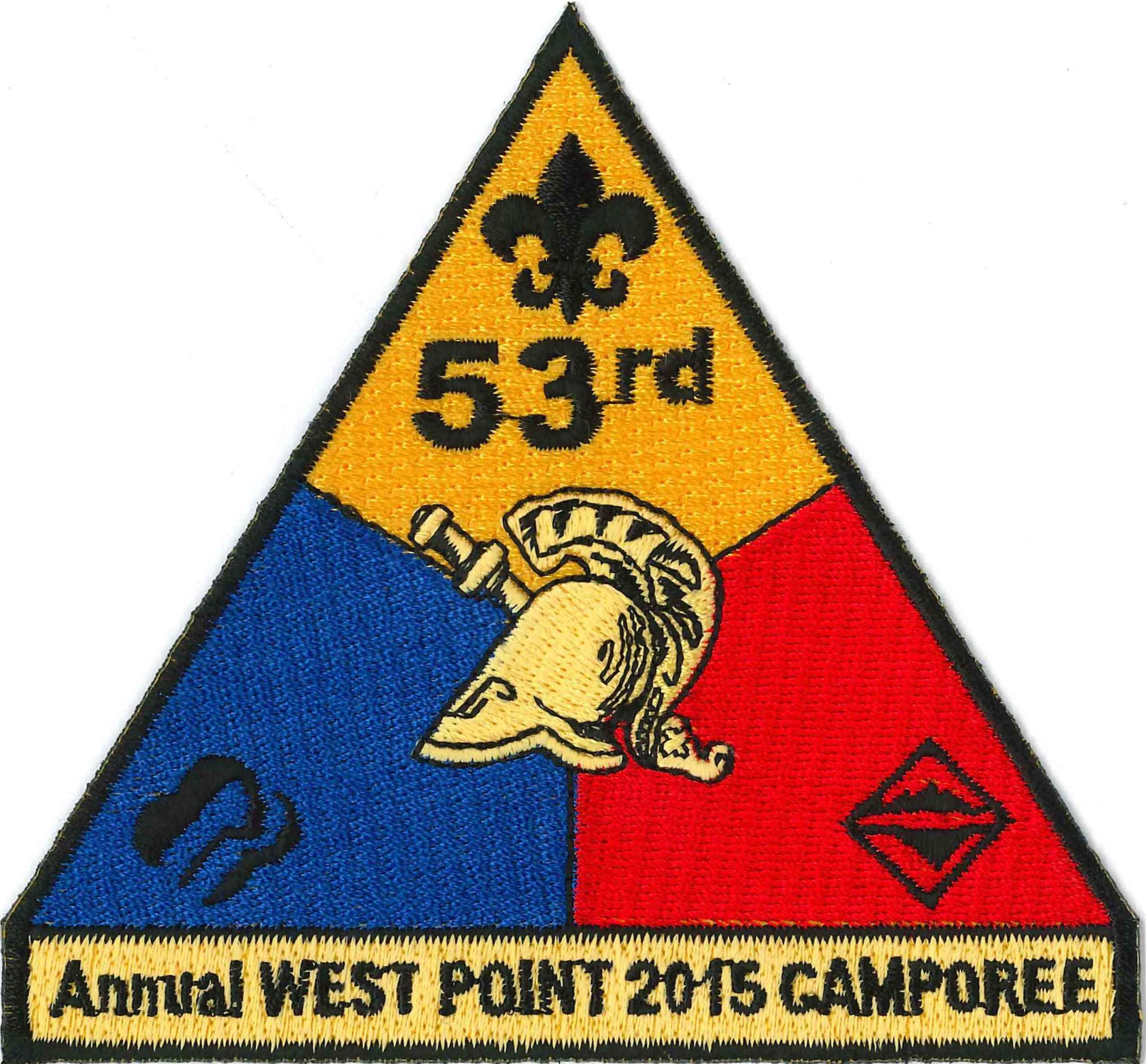

The official patch in recent history is a variant of an Army unit patch. For instance, this example is from the 1st Armored Division "Old Ironsides" unit patch.

== Attendance ==
Camporee is nominally held the last week of April; however, since 2001, dates are adjusted around the Academy's schedule. The invitational nature reflects the priority for a Cadet to invite their "home" Scout Troop, Venturing Crew, Sea Scout Ship, Varsity Crew, Explorer Post. If the available slots are not filled by home organizations of the Cadets; a lottery is held among other Scout units. Participants in the lottery indicate that they typically receive an invitation about once in every five years.

Each attending organization may choose to attend the Camporee as a "Lightfighter" or "Mechanized" troop. Lightfighter troops must backpack all of their gear four miles through the hills surrounding West Point to the Camporee site. Those who complete the trek earn the "I Hiked Bull Hill" pin and a Lightfighter patch.

== Competitions ==
The camporee offers competitions in events such as Tactical Challenge, Grenade Toss, Camouflage, Wilderness Survival, and First Aid.
