= Scouting America national headquarters =

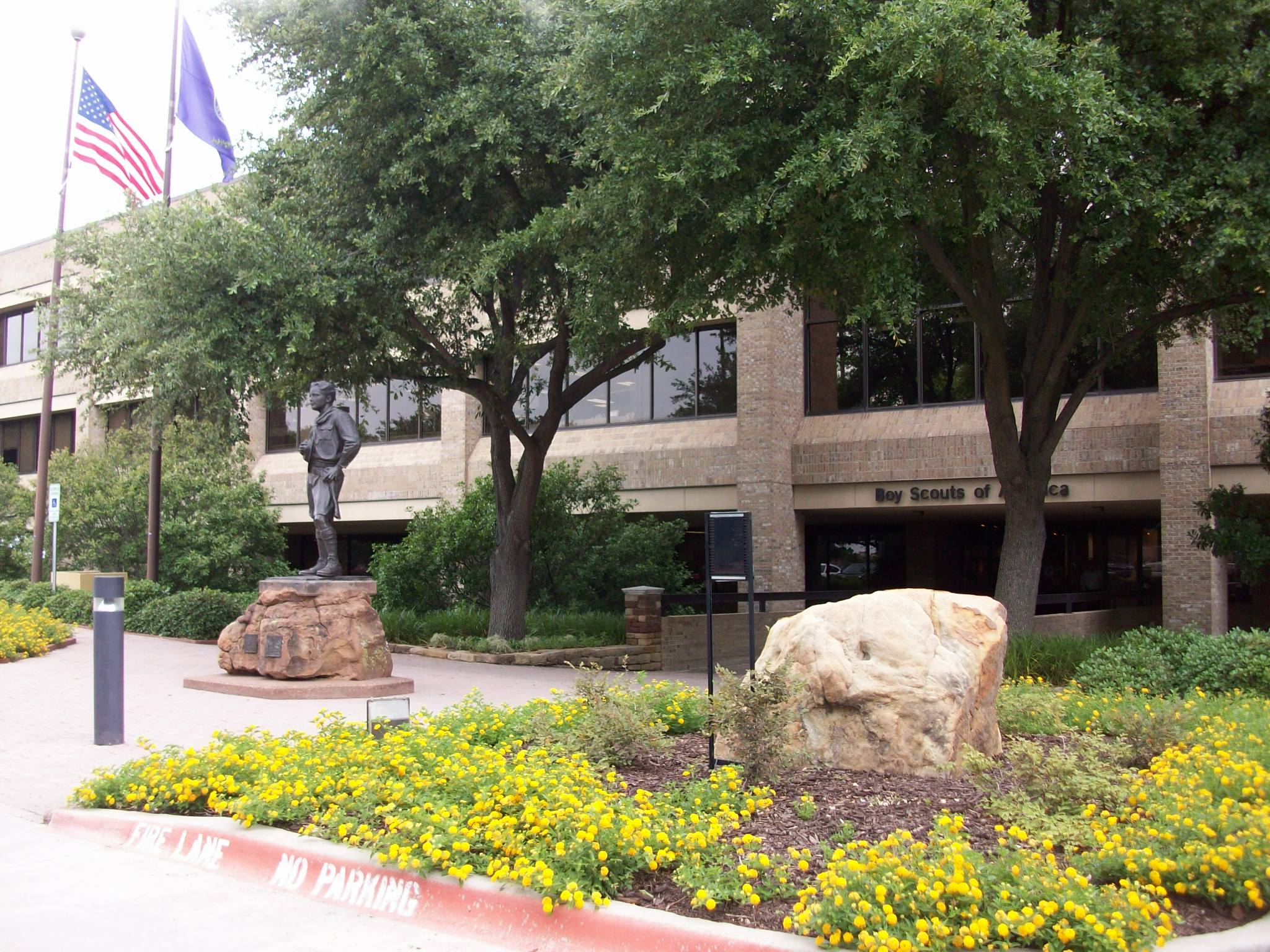
- Location: Irving, Texas

The Scouting America national headquarters were established in 1910 in New York City and opened in January 1911.

== Background ==
From 1910 to 1927, the offices were at the Toy Center at 200 Fifth Avenue in Manhattan. In 1927, the National Office moved to 2 Park Avenue in Manhattan.

In 1954, the National Council of the Boy Scouts of America (BSA) moved its national headquarters from New York City to a new site at the southwest corner of U.S. Route 1 and U.S. Route 130 in North Brunswick, New Jersey, although the location appeared in BSA publications as "New Brunswick". The former Boy Scouts building is now known as 100 Fidelity Plaza, and is managed as part of the Offices at Campus Pointe business center.

The Johnston Historical Museum and a conservation education trail were also located there.

Since 1979, the Boy Scouts of America National Council has been in Irving, Texas.

== Gallery ==
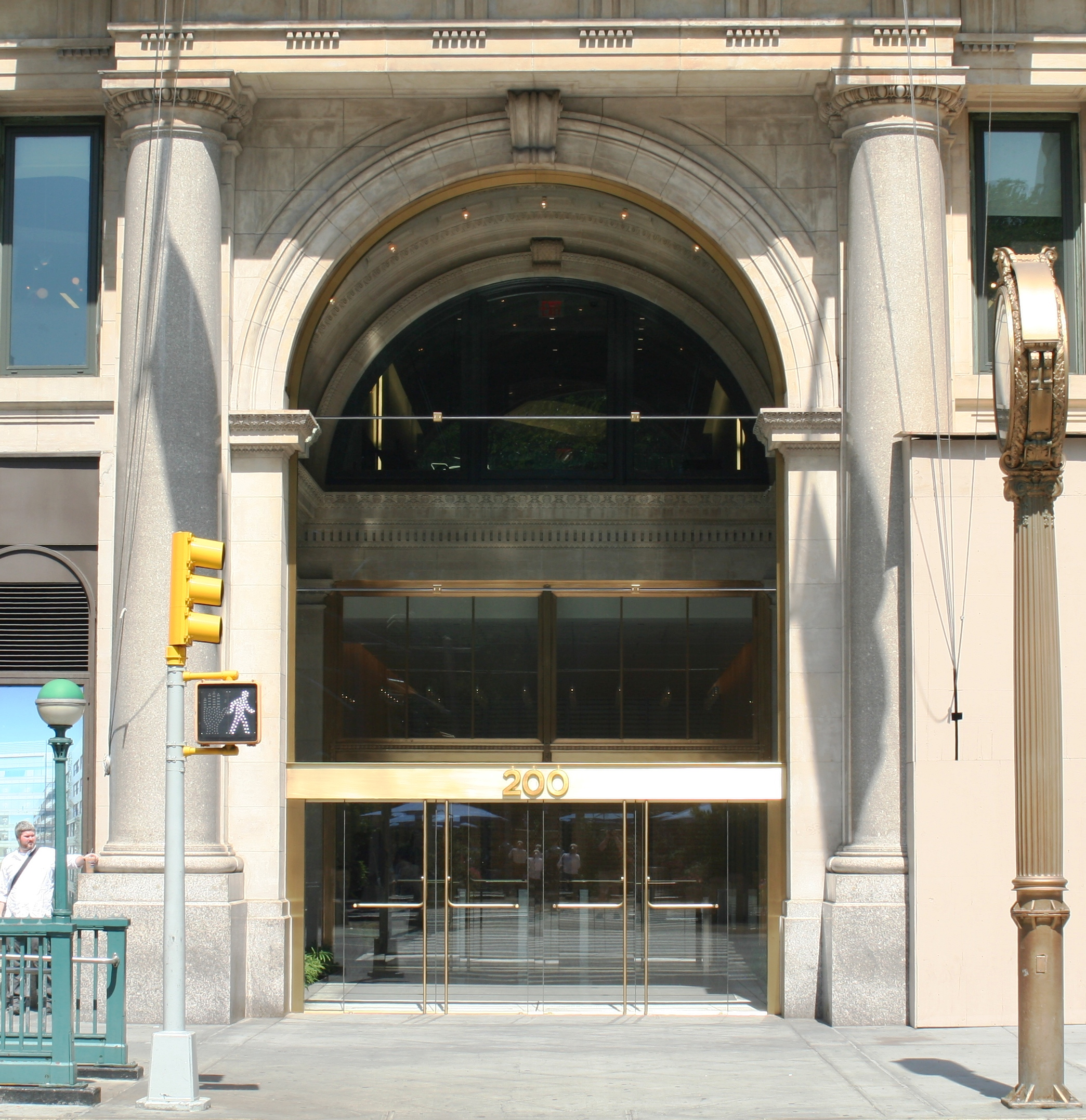
Toy Center Building

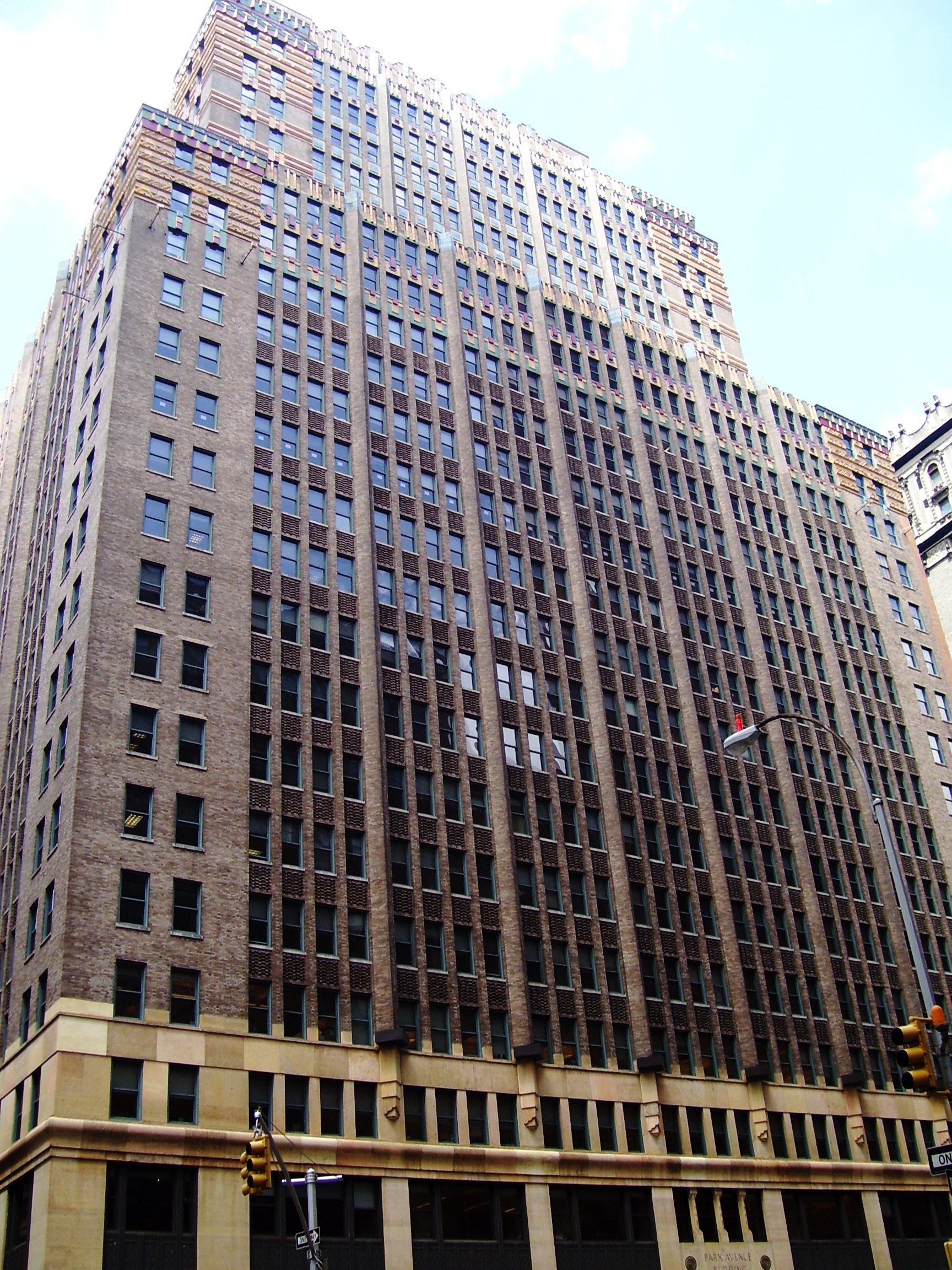
2 Park Avenue

New Brunswick, New Jersey
