= Massawepie Lake =

Lake in St. Lawrence County, New York, United States

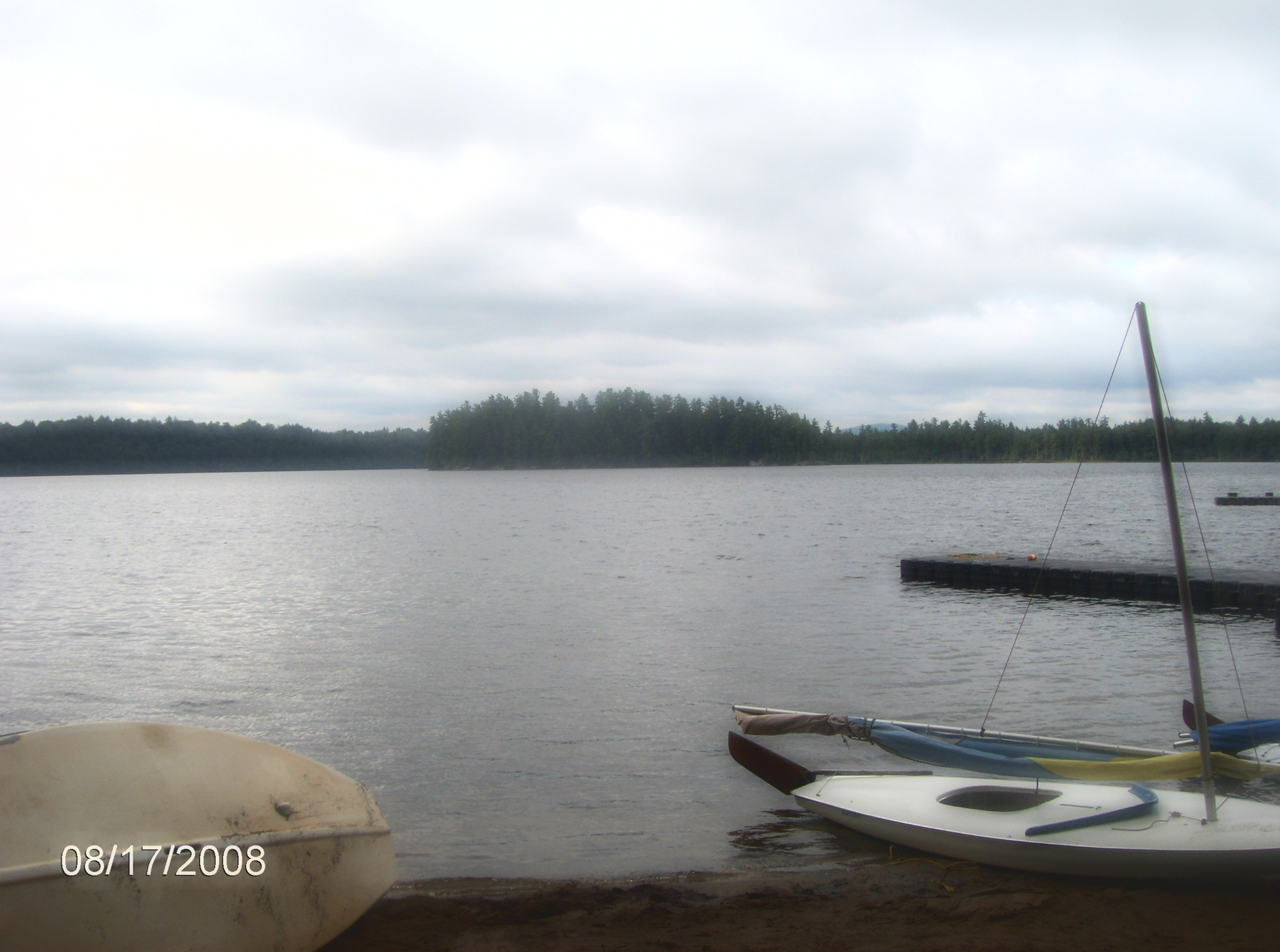

- Location within New York Massawepie Lake (the United States)
- Location: St. Lawrence County, New York
- Coordinates: 44°15′28″N 74°38′44″W
- Basin countries: United States
- Surface area: 431 acres (1.74 km^{2})
- Average depth: 23 feet (7.0 m)
- Max. depth: 75 feet (23 m)
- Surface elevation: 1,512 feet (461 m)
- Islands: 1

Massawepie Lake is located in the town of Piercefield, in southern St. Lawrence County, New York, approximately 12 miles (19 km) southwest of the village of Tupper Lake, New York. The lake is also surrounded by the Massawepie Scout Camps. The name of the lake is of Iroquois origin, meaning "the beaver's lake". The outlet flows west into the South Branch Grass River.

== Fishing ==
The lake offers shore fishing, and there is a carry-down launch on the east shore on Massawepie Road with permission from the Massawepie Scout Camp. Public use is prohibited from June to August. Fish species present in the lake are lake trout, smallmouth bass, whitefish, walleye, yellow perch, black bullhead, rock bass, and white sucker.

== Geography ==
One of the most notable geographic features is the Massawepie Mire located immediately to the south of the lake. It is bordered by two long north-south eskers. Hundreds of acres in size, the bog is one of the largest of its kind in the Eastern United States and is almost entirely on the Boy Scout camp's property.

== History ==
In 1890, the Childwold Park House, commonly known as the Childwold Hotel, open on the shore of Massawepie Lake, just east of the main flagpole of the current camp. In the days before air-conditioning, upperclass residents of New York City would retreat to the Adirondacks to escape the summer heat. Visitors to Childwold Park would take the New York Central Railroad north from Utica and get off at Childwold Station. From there they would take a 7-mile (11 km) trip along the Carriage Road to the hotel. The hotel burned down in 1910.
