= Seneca Waterways Council =

Boy Scout council

Seneca Waterways Council (#397)
- Owner: Boy Scouts of America
- Headquarters: 2320 Brighton-Henrietta Town Line Road, Rochester, New York
- Country: United States
- Founded: 2009
- Website www.senecawaterways.org

Seneca Waterways Council (SWC) is a local council of the Boy Scouts of America that serves youth in Ontario, Wayne, Seneca, Yates, and Monroe Counties in Western New York. The current Council President is Ted Orr. The current Council Scout Executive is Stephen Hoitt.

As of May 25, 2021, the council has seven districts.

== History ==
In 1917 the Brockport Council was formed, closing in 1918.

In 1917 the Ontario County Council (#391) was formed, changing its name to the Finger Lakes Council (#391) in 1924.

The Rochester Council (#397) was granted a charter on February 13, 1913. The council expanded to include Monroe, Orleans and Wayne counties, and in 1926 the name was changed to the Rochester Area Council (#397) to reflect the growth. In December 1932, Monroe and Orleans counties split off to become the Red Jacket Council (#363).

In 1943, the Wayne County portion of the Rochester Area Council (#397) was transferred to the Finger Lakes Council (#391); the Orleans County portion of the Red Jacket Council was transferred to the Lewiston Trail Council (#385), and the remaining Monroe County portion merged with the Red Jacket Council (#363) to form the Otetiana Council (#397).

The Seneca Waterways Council was founded in 2009 with the merger of the Finger Lakes Council (#391) and Otetiana Council (#397), both in Western New York.

The Finger Lakes Council served the Finger Lakes Region of New York. At the time of the merger with the Otetiana Council the council service center was located in Geneva, New York and it was operating Camp Babcock–Hovey in Ovid, New York.

The Otetiana Council served the Greater Rochester area. At the time of the merger with the Finger Lakes Council the council service center was located in Downtown Rochester, New York and it was operating the Massawepie Scout Camps in the Adirondack Park as well as Camp Cutler in Naples, New York.

The Seneca Waterways Council Scouting Historical Society has a collection of memorabilia relating to the history of Scouting in the Seneca Waterways Council. Exhibits are displayed at the council service center.

== Organization ==
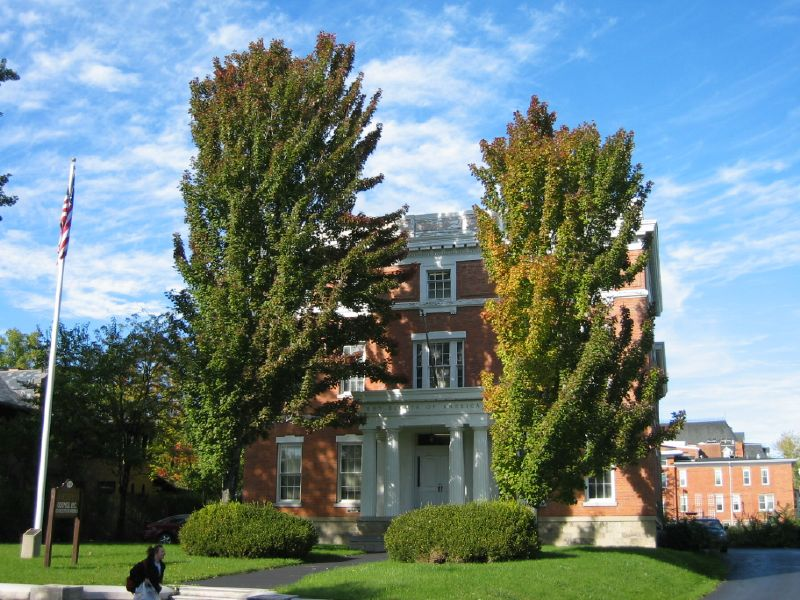
Council office

As of May 25, 2021, the council has seven districts.

The council was divided into seven administrative districts, each of which serves one or more towns:

- Erie Trails District — Serving the areas of Rush, Henrietta, East Rochester, Bloomfield, Pittsford, Fairport, Mendon, and Honeoye Falls.
- Glacier Lakes District — Serving the Finger Lakes Region, including Seneca County, Yates County, and Ontario County (except Bloomfield)
- High Falls District — Serving the City of Rochester, Town of Irondequoit and the Brighton Central School District
- Turning Point District/ScoutReach — Serving the City of Rochester School District (after-school programs)
- Waters Edge District — Serving the towns of Webster, Penfield, Ontario, Walworth, Marion, Macedon, Palmyra, Lyons, Sodus, Newark, North Rose, Wolcott, and Red Creek.
- Western Gateway District — Serving the communities of Western Monroe County, including Greece, Hilton, Spencerport, Brockport, Hamlin, Gates, Chili, Churchville, and Scottsville.
- Exploring - Serving our five-county area. Exploring is a co-ed career education program for male and female youth ages 14–20.

== Camps ==
Some of the historical camps maintained by Seneca Waterways Council's predecessors included Camp Otetiana (Canandaigua Lake, 1918–1926); Camp Tarion (Canandaigua Lake, 1925–1933); Camp Pioneer (Seneca Lake, 1927–1938); Camp Three Lakes (Lake Ontario/Durand-Eastman Park 1931–1939); Camp Arrowhead (Sandy Harbor/Hamlin, 1933–1937); Camp Archibald (Point Breeze/Carlton, 1938–1942); Camp EONAC (Cranberry Lake/Wanakena, 1938–1949); Brown Camp (Wolcott, 1938–?); Camp J. Warren Cutler (Lake Ontario/Webster, 1939–1962); Camp Eagle Island (Lake Ontario/Sodus Bay, 1943–1951); Camp Muller (Naples, ?–?); and Horn Farm Camp (1947–?).

Camp Babcock-Hovey (1937–2022) was a council camp in the Finger Lakes Region, near in Ovid, New York, on the east shore of Seneca Lake and spanned 283 acres (1.15 km^{2}) of woodlands and fields. The Scouts BSA summer program was removed from the camp in Fall 2021. The camp was shut down in 2022 and sold in 2023.

Seneca Waterways Council maintains two year-round camps: J. Warren Cutler Scout Reservation in Naples, New York (1963–) and The Massawepie Scout Camps in Piercefield, New York (1952–).

=== J. Warren Cutler Scout Reservation ===
The J. Warren Cutler Scout Reservation, also known as Camp Cutler, is a 1,200-acre (4.9 km^{2}) camp located in the heart of the Finger Lakes Region of western New York State. It is named after Joseph Warren Cutler (1857–1934), a prominent Rochester businessman who ran the Cutler Manufacturing Company with his brother James Goold Cutler (1848–1927). Joseph Cutler was an avid supporter of Scouting and served as the treasurer of the Rochester Council. After the younger Cutler's death, his widow, Mrs. Amy Jenkins Cutler (1874–1958), donated their family summer home on Lake Road in Webster, New York, to form part of the original Camp Cutler, which was dedicated in 1939. Chief Scout Executive James E. West was present for the event. In the early 1960s Monroe County purchased the property along with additional acreage that had been obtained by the council and added the property to Webster Park. During the same time, negotiations began with the Keenan family to purchase their lands for a new camp. An agreement was reached and the first portion of the new camp was purchased in January 1962. Five years later, in 1966, a dedication ceremony was held. The new Camp J. Warren Cutler has been in continual operation since that time.

Camp Cutler is a year-round facility. The camp offers many camping opportunities for Scouts. Campsites range from primitive to rustic sites with lean-tos, to buildings with wood-burning stoves, winterized buildings, training centers with kitchen equipment that can support large groups, and the theme buildings that house the Cub Scout Adventure Camp.

The camp is staffed by professional forest rangers, assisted on week-ends by BSA volunteers known as "Camp Masters".

The Cub Scout Adventure Camp, also known as "CSAC," was dedicated in 1993 and operates at Camp Cutler in July and August. Cub Scout Adventure Camp is a three-day, two night Cub Scout summer camp based on five adventure themes: the ships of the High Seas, a fort of the old west, a castle of medieval times, a mountain man encampment and a Native American village.

=== Massawepie Scout Camps ===
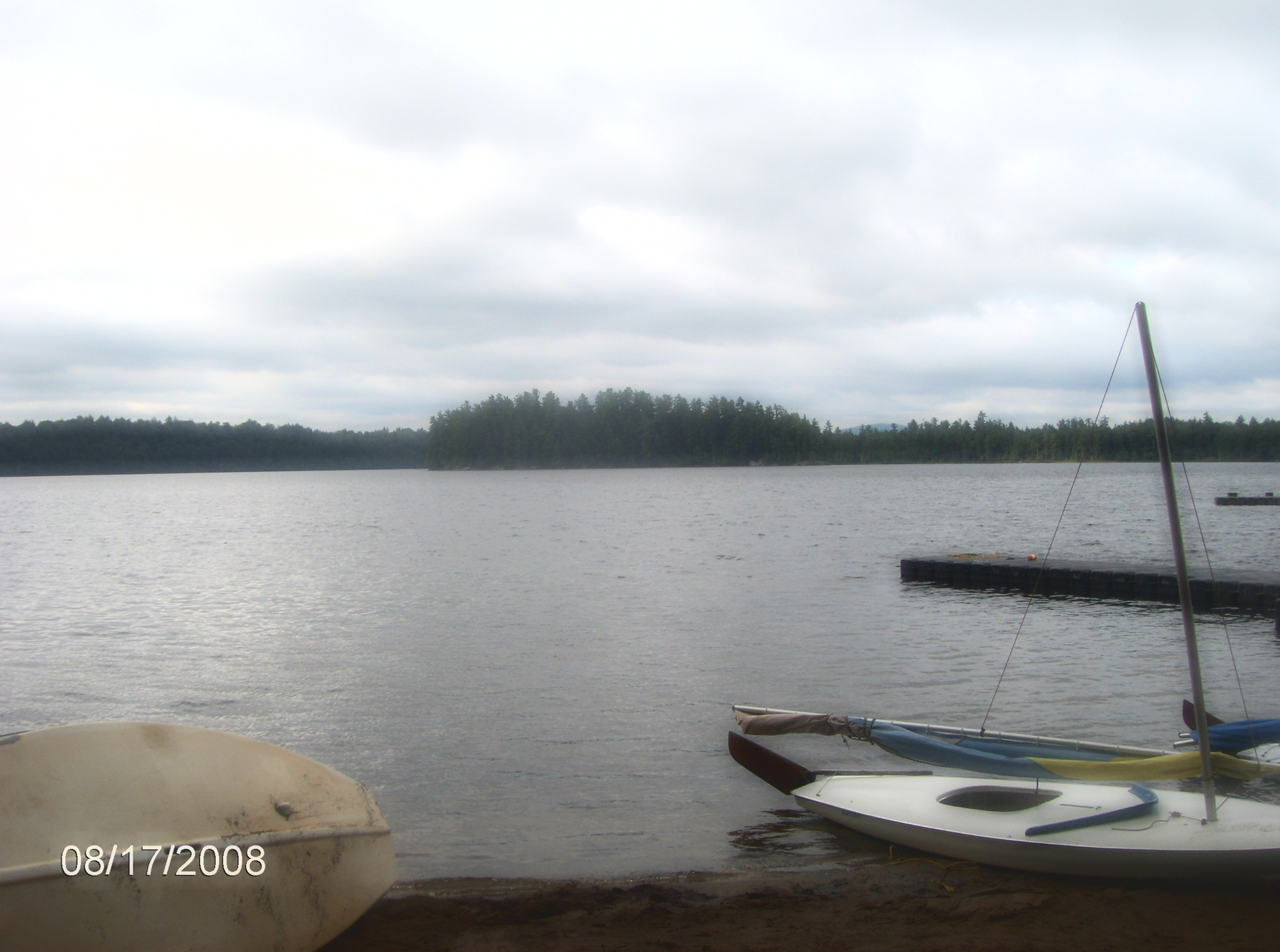
Massawepie Lake

Massawepie Scout Camps (the MSC) is a Boy Scout reservation, owned by Seneca Waterways Council, situated around Massawepie Lake in St. Lawrence County of New York. Otetiana Council purchased the Massawepie property in 1951, and opened the first summer camp in 1952. The area is divided into 4 camps: Mountaineer, Pioneer, Forester, and Voyager. As of 2016 only Pioneer is in use as an active campground (With campsites from Voyager incorporated into Pioneer); Camp Mountaineer is in use for ancillary activities. The size of the entire reservation is approximately 5,000 acres (2,000 ha). The reservation includes all of Massawepie Lake and nine other freshwater ponds (Catamount, Long, Round, Horseshoe, Boot Tree, Deer, Town Line, Pine and Lost). The camp is one of the largest Boy Scout reservations in the Northeastern United States, and attracts visiting Boy Scout troops from throughout the region and the country, including California, and New Jersey.

Massawepie means "the beaver's lake" in Iroquois.

== Tschipey Achtu Lodge ==
The Order of the Arrow is represented by Tschipey Achtu Lodge. The lodge was formed in 2010 by a merger of Ty-Ohni Lodge, founded in 1936, and Ganeodiyo Lodge, founded in 1949. Tschipey Achtu means Ghost Deer. The Lodge membership voted to use the official name Tschipey Achtu Lodge No. 397, but the ability to use 397 as a lodge number is under some debate, and Tschipey Achtu is operating without a lodge number.

== See also ==
- Scouting in New York
- S.S.S. Lotus
