= Tupper Lake =

Tupper Lake, New York may refer to:

- Tupper Lake (New York), lake in the Adirondack Park
- Tupper Lake (village), New York
- Tupper Lake (town), New York
