= New York State Route 421 =

State highway located in Adirondack Park, New York

New York State Route 421
- Map of the Tupper Lake area with NY 421 highlighted in red, former NY 421 extension in pink, former NY 971D in grey

Route information
- Maintained by NYSDOT
- Length: 5.70 mi (9.17 km)
- Existed: c. 1931–present

Major junctions
- West end: Dead end at Horseshoe Lake in Piercefield
- East end: NY 30 in Piercefield

Location
- Country: United States
- State: New York
- Counties: St. Lawrence

Highway system
- New York Highways; Interstate; US; State; Reference; Parkways
← NY 420	→ NY 422

New York State Route 421 (NY 421) is a short state highway located within Adirondack Park in the southeastern corner of St. Lawrence County, New York, in the United States. It is a narrow, two-lane spur route connecting NY 30 to Horseshoe Lake by way of Tupper Lake. A dead end sign is posted immediately off NY 30, the only route with which it intersects. The entire road is located in the town of Piercefield, although that name is not posted on NY 421. The route offers access to several picnic and snowmobile areas.

The eastern portion of NY 421 was built in the 1920s under the terms of a 1923 law authorizing the construction of a highway leading from modern NY 30 north to Warren Point. This road was completed in 1925. NY 421 was assigned to the entirety of the north–south highway c. 1931. The roadway connecting Horseshoe Lake to Tupper Lake was built in 1961 on a former alignment of the Delaware and Hudson Railway. NY 421's former routing to Warren Point remained a state highway up through 1999, when a bill permitting the New York State Department of Transportation (NYSDOT) to remove it from the state highway system was signed into law.

== Route description ==
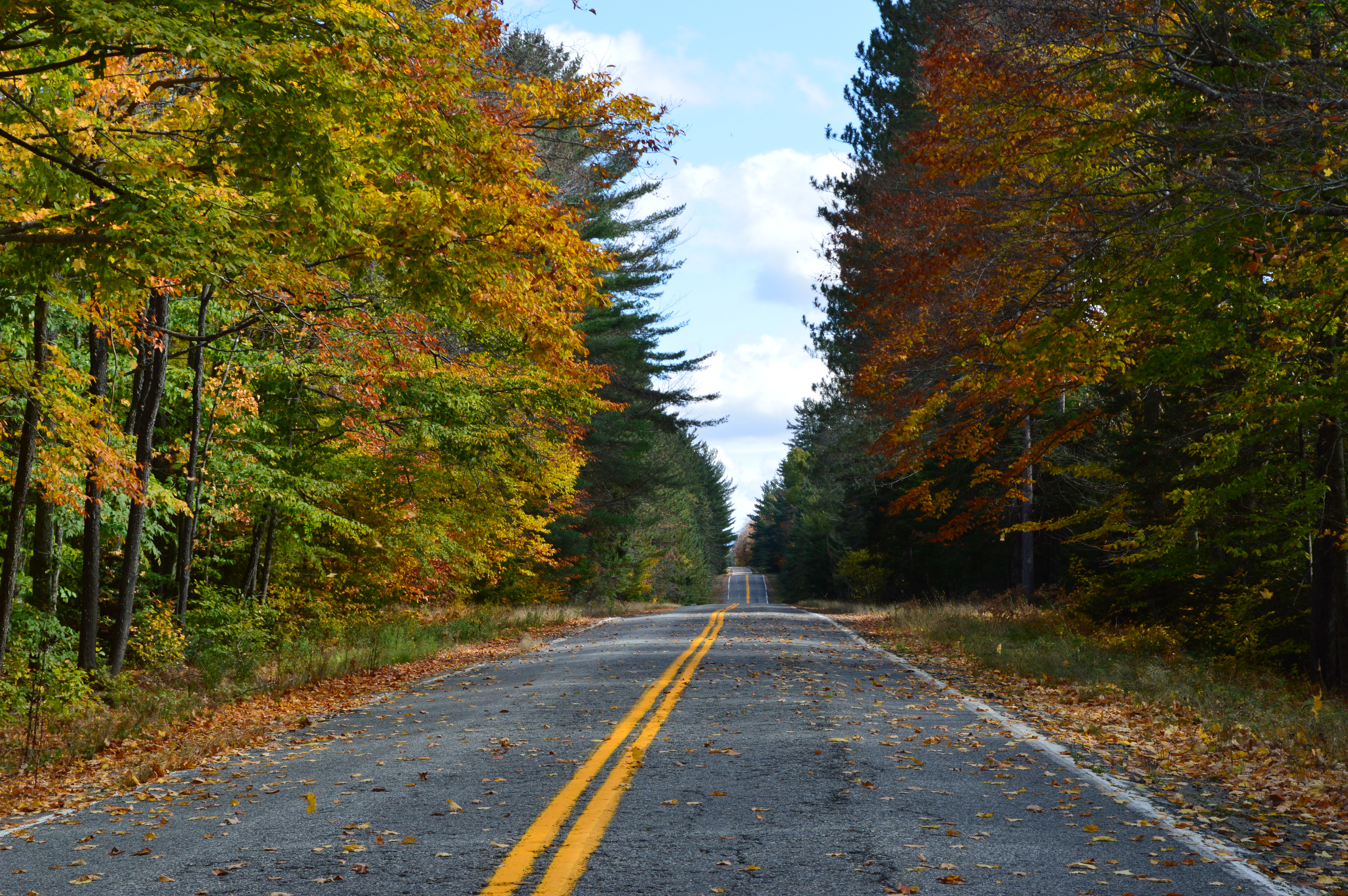
NY 421 in Piercefield

NY 421 begins at a dead end south of the hamlet of Horseshoe in an isolated part of the town of Piercefield. Here, the highway connects to a pair of dirt roads, one of which leads north alongside Horseshoe Lake to Horseshoe. The two-lane route heads eastward from the trails, following the southern shore of Horseshoe Lake while traversing the deep woods of Adirondack Park. At the southeastern end of the lake, NY 421 turns northeastward, crossing a small stream feeding into the lake before curving back toward the east. For the next 2 miles (3.2 km), the road passes through unabated wilderness as it heads toward the western shoreline of Tupper Lake.

At Tupper Lake, the route serves a cluster of recreational buildings at its intersection with Warren Point Road, a private drive leading to Warren Point. Here, NY 421 turns southward, running along the lake shore to nearby Paradise Point Road, which leads east to Paradise Point and the lakeside Veterans' Mountain Camp. After Paradise Point Road, the highway follows a winding, southeasterly course along Tupper Lake, passing little more than dense forests while crossing over the Bog River near its mouth. NY 421 follows the lake to its southern tip, where the route ends at an intersection with NY 30 just west of the St. Lawrence–Franklin county line.

== History ==
In 1923, the New York State Legislature passed a law authorizing the construction of a highway connecting Route 24 (an unsigned legislative route that is now part of NY 30) to the new Veterans' Mountain Camp, an American Legion camp on Tupper Lake. The work was funded through appropriations defined in the law. The beginning of a state road to the camp came in 1924 when earth movers were brought in by the Harnathy Contracting Company, with construction beginning in early June. The project would include construction of a concrete bridge over the Bog River. However, Hanrathy was unable to finish the job as it went bankrupt, and a second firm, the Spadaccini Realty Construction Corporation of The Bronx was brought into finish the job, which began in June 1925. The bridge over the Bog River was completed on August 29, 1925, and they announced would be opened for traffic within ten days. The route finally opened in 1925, with the Veterans Camp opening on May 15, 1926. This road was extended from modern NY 30 north to a dead end at Warren Point. In the 1930 renumbering of state highways in New York, hundreds of state-maintained highways that did not yet have a designation were assigned one. The Veterans' Mountain Camp highway was designated as NY 421 by the following year.

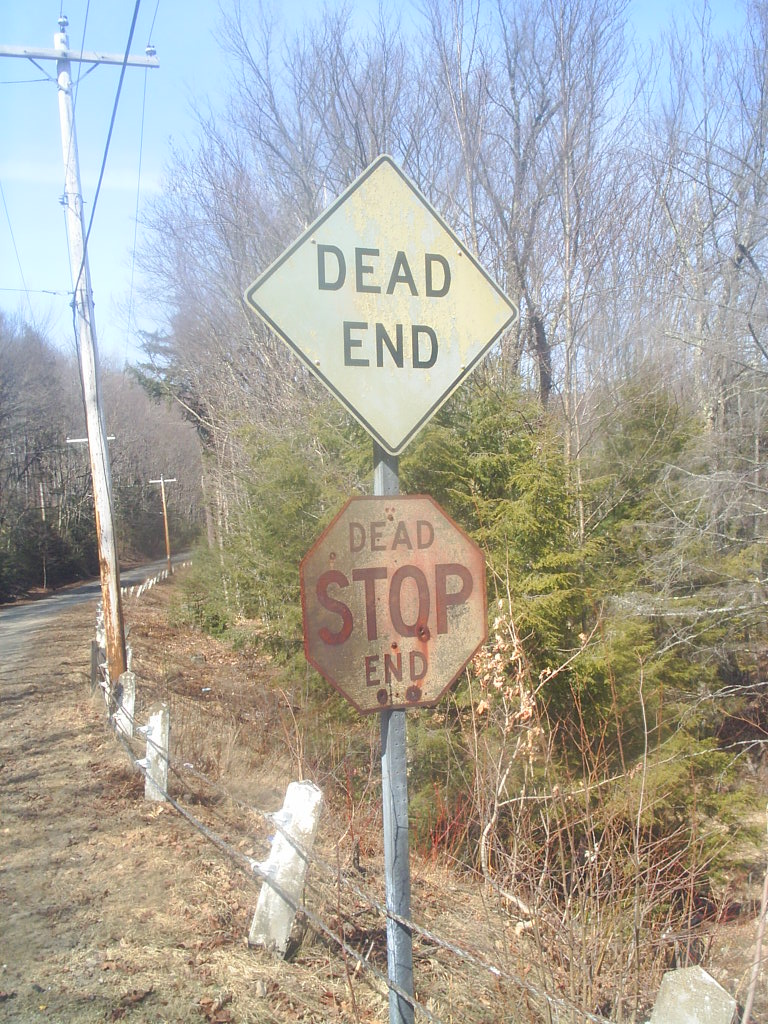
Signage at NY 421's western terminus, a dead end in Piercefield

On February 22, 1960, the American Legion Mountain Camp Corporation in Albany, New York made a decision to abdicate a right-of-way west of NY 421 to the Delaware and Hudson Railway station at Horseshoe. The decision was made because the Veterans Mountain Camp, operated by the American Legion, would not operate during the summer of 1960. This 4.1 miles (6.6 km) right-of-way would be given to the New York State Department of Public Works (NYSDPW) to build a new public highway for traffic between the two destinations. This would open the area to trout fishermen who would visit the Horseshoe area. Fishermen in the area would have to take the Delaware and Hudson Railway line from Little Tupper Lake and Sabattis to reach fishing spots on Big Tupper Lake.

NYSDPW let out bids for the project, which would construct a new gravel road with asphalt over the former dirt, with a right-of-way that narrowed to 50 feet (15 m) wide due to state lands on each side. Because of the use of state lands, the right-of-way owned by the American Legion bypassed issues with construction. If the new public roadway would have used the state land, it would have cost more. NYSDPW awarded a contract to the Jubilee Construction Company of Plattsburgh for $169,000 (1960 USD). The state sent out an engineer to set up the road for construction and the company brought in equipment by May 1960. The first week of May, Jubilee Construction closed the road to begin construction.

The construction project was near completion in November 1960. As part of that, the American Legion believed they could re-open the camp in 1961. In April 1961, the American Legion announced the camp would re-open June 1, 1961. Despite the construction of the new road, the Department of Public Works let out a bid in February 1967 to resurface the new highway at the cost of $149,484.

It became part of an extended NY 421 by 1968. At the time, NY 421's western terminus was located at a railroad crossing in the isolated hamlet of Horseshoe, situated at the northwestern corner or Horseshoe Lake. The former routing of NY 421 north to Warren Point, legislatively designated as State Highway 9106B, was initially considered a spur of NY 421; it was later redesignated as NY 971D, an unsigned reference route. By 1993, the west end of NY 421 was moved about 1 mile (1.6 km) south to its current location southwest of Horseshoe Lake.

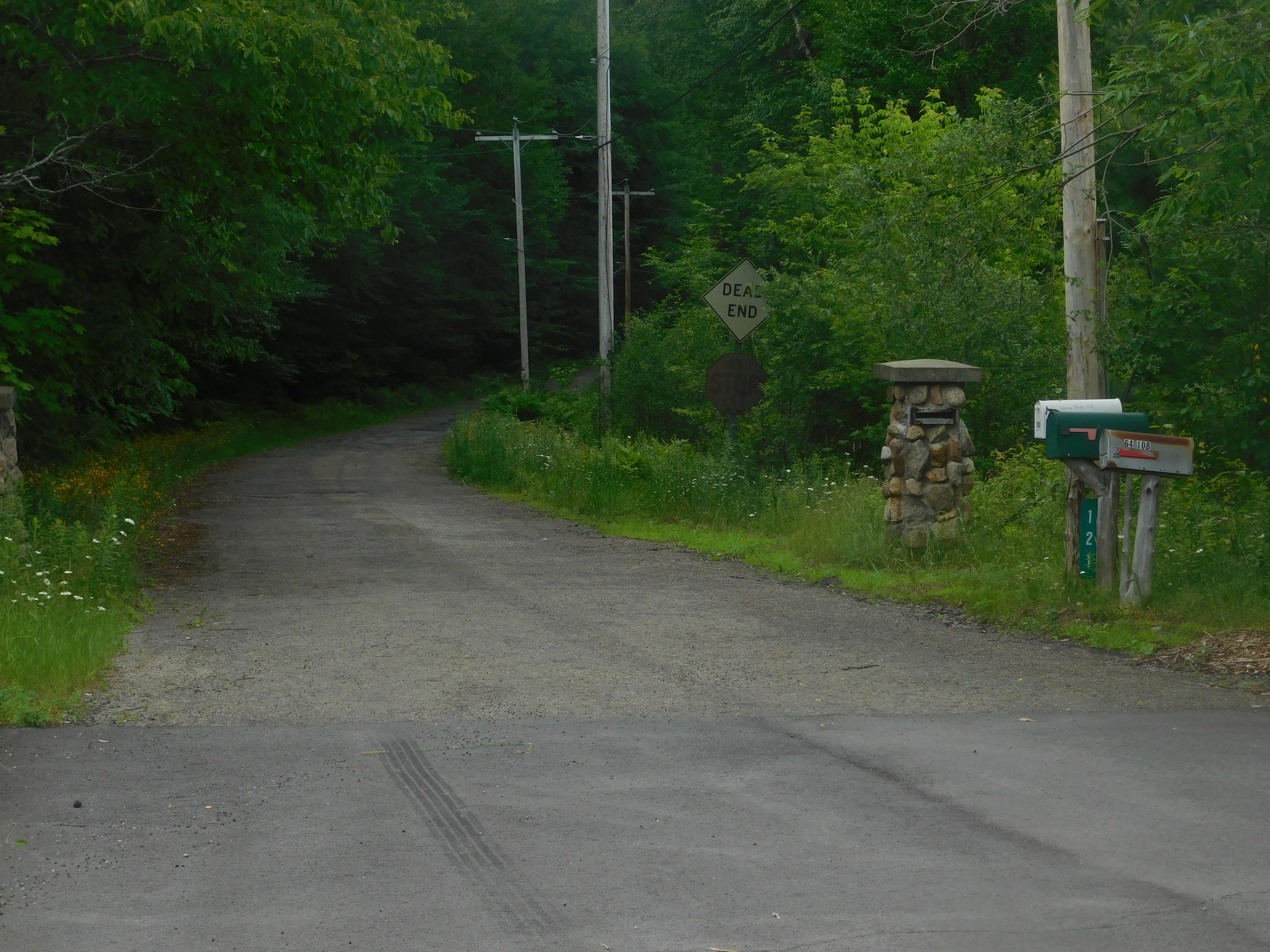
The former alignment of NY 421 and NY 971D in Piercefield

After the Veterans' Mountain Camp was closed in the 1960s, the property was sold off to private owners, turning NY 971D into little more than a private drive. Thus, the road saw little use, handling less than 10 vehicles per day on average. As a result, the New York State Department of Transportation (NYSDOT) no longer considered the highway worthy of inclusion in the state highway system and began to take steps to remove the highway from the system. On February 22, 1999, NYSDOT sent a memorandum to the New York State Senate that laid out the groundwork for a bill which, if passed, would allow NYSDOT to remove NY 971D from the state highway system once it was able to transfer ownership and maintenance of the highway to another entity. A bill based on the memo was introduced in the State Senate on March 29 and eventually passed by the Senate and the New York State Assembly. The bill was signed into law by Governor George Pataki on July 27, 1999. The former routing of NY 971D is now officially a private drive.

In January 1978, the state and St. Lawrence County, New York opened up about discussions to swap road mileage in the county. As part of the discussions, NY 184, NY 185, NY 186, NY 195, NY 345 and NY 421 would be transferred to St. Lawrence County. St. Lawrence would transfer 14 different county roads to the state. However, St. Lawrence County stated they did not like the offer of NY 421. A similar proposal in 1980 dropped NY 421 and NY 184 from the swap, and added NY 970M in the town of Lawrence.

On January 17, 1980, the New York State Department of Transportation announced they would open bids to rebuild a stretch of NY 421 of 1.5 miles (2.4 km). This would be from a spot north of NY 30 to Horseshoe Pond Road. NY 421 would be widened from 16 feet (4.9 m) wide to 20 feet (6.1 m) wide with 3 feet (0.91 m) wide gravel shoulders. The bridge over the Bog River would also receive new railings. The project went to John R. Dudley Construction of Cicero, New York at $559,689.32 (the lowest of nine bids).

== Major intersections ==
The entire route is in Piercefield, St. Lawrence County.

mi	km	Destinations	Notes
0.00	0.00	Dead end at Horseshoe Lake	Western terminus
5.70	9.17	NY 30 – Tupper Lake, Long Lake	Eastern terminus
1.000 mi = 1.609 km; 1.000 km = 0.621 mi
