= Coney Mountain =

Mountain in New York, United States

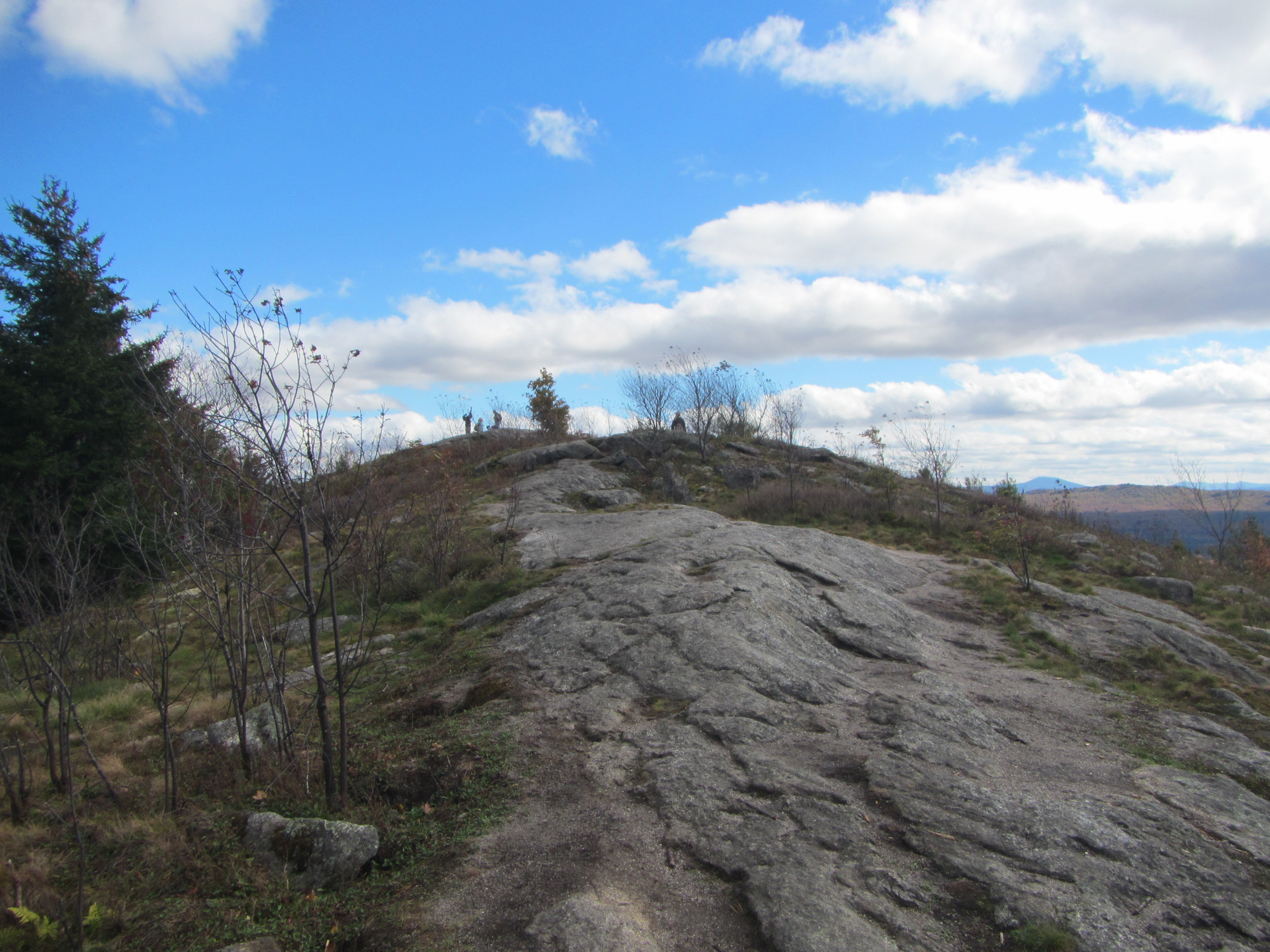
- Coney Mountain summit, fall 2017

Highest point
- Elevation: 2,264 ft (690 m)
- Prominence: 410
- Coordinates: 44°06′06″N 74°31′24″W

Geography
- Location within New York Adirondack Park Location within the United States
- Location: Tupper Lake, Franklin County, New York, U.S.
- Parent range: Adirondacks
- Topo map: USGS Little Tupper Lake

Climbing
- Easiest route: Hike

Coney Mountain is a 2,264-foot-tall (690 m) mountain located primarily in the town of Tupper Lake, in the northern part of the Adirondack Mountain Range. It is notable for its prominent bald summit affording widespread views and ease of access in all seasons.

== History ==
Originally known as Monument Mountain, the summit's first known ascent was in 1772 during Archibald Campbell's survey of the Totten and Crossfield Purchase. It received its current name―for its conical shape―during one of Verplanck Colvin's surveying trips.

== Description ==
Coney Mountain is situated in the Horseshoe Lake Wild Forest. The mountain is a ridge running north-northwest to south-southeast. While its summit and hiking trail are located in Franklin County, the southeast end of the ridge is partly situated in Long Lake, Hamilton County.

== Recreation ==
With a 1.1-mile hike gaining 560 feet of elevation from New York Route 30 that provides 360-degree views, Coney Mountain is a popular hiking attraction during the summer and fall and snowshoeing site in the winter. The trail was constructed in 2009 to replace a shorter but much steeper bushwhack to the summit. Views from the summit include the Seward Range, Santanoni Peak, Blue Mountain, Tupper Lake, Little Tupper Lake and sites in the Whitney Wilderness.

It is part of the "Tupper Lake Triad," a hiking challenge that also includes Mount Arab and nearby Goodman Mountain. The well-maintained hiking trail approached Coney Mountain from the west, then circles around the north of the mountain a saddle on its southeast side, at which point hikers ascend a rocky slide to the treeless summit.

Due to its remoteness from settlements and its bald summit, Coney Mountain is also known as a dark-sky site for stargazing and astrophotography.
