= List of lakes of Jefferson County, Arkansas =

There are at least 56 named lakes and reservoirs in Jefferson County, Arkansas.

== Lakes ==
- Atkins Lake, 34°12′34″N 091°52′34″W, el. 187 feet (57 m)
- Bernett Lake, 34°18′14″N 091°50′40″W, el. 207 feet (63 m)
- Big Grassy Brake, 34°11′16″N 091°33′45″W, el. 177 feet (54 m)
- Brean Lake, 34°15′33″N 091°55′05″W, el. 200 feet (61 m)
- Brushy Lake, 34°07′36″N 091°33′33″W, el. 174 feet (53 m)
- Clear Pond, 34°19′51″N 092°06′01″W, el. 246 feet (75 m)
- Dilly Pond, 34°18′33″N 092°04′03″W, el. 236 feet (72 m)
- Dudley Lake, 34°27′13″N 091°53′28″W, el. 203 feet (62 m)
- English Lake, 34°09′24″N 091°37′59″W, el. 177 feet (54 m)
- Farelly Lake, 34°06′36″N 091°29′14″W, el. 167 feet (51 m)
- Felix Pond, 34°22′35″N 092°01′44″W, el. 220 feet (67 m)
- Five Forks Lake, 34°17′03″N 091°49′57″W, el. 190 feet (58 m)
- Hannaberry Lake, 34°07′12″N 091°33′39″W, el. 171 feet (52 m)
- Horseshoe Lake, 34°23′07″N 091°59′44″W, el. 207 feet (63 m)
- Horseshoe Pond, 34°20′14″N 092°05′54″W, el. 253 feet (77 m)
- Imbeau Bayou, 34°09′13″N 091°58′39″W, el. 200 feet (61 m)
- Johnson Lake, 34°06′42″N 091°32′01″W, el. 174 feet (53 m)
- Johnson Lake, 34°13′37″N 091°54′54″W, el. 200 feet (61 m)
- Lake Dick, 34°15′13″N 091°50′33″W, el. 190 feet (58 m)
- Langford Lake, 34°10′27″N 091°36′18″W, el. 177 feet (54 m)
- Long Lake, 34°06′11″N 091°43′11″W, el. 184 feet (56 m)
- Mud Lake, 34°07′44″N 091°34′45″W, el. 161 feet (49 m)
- Noble Lake, 34°09′53″N 091°49′57″W, el. 187 feet (57 m)
- Old River Lake, 34°25′14″N 092°05′10″W, el. 213 feet (65 m)
- Patton Lake, 34°23′04″N 091°56′39″W, el. 207 feet (63 m)
- Reed Lake, 34°16′08″N 091°51′21″W, el. 190 feet (58 m)
- Swan Lake, 34°13′20″N 091°41′48″W, el. 184 feet (56 m)
- Wilkins Lake, 34°15′22″N 091°55′36″W, el. 200 feet (61 m)
- Willow Lake, 34°15′19″N 091°55′12″W, el. 200 feet (61 m)

== Reservoirs ==
- Arsenal Lake, 34°22′19″N 092°05′34″W, el. 223 feet (68 m)
- Clean Water Holding Pond, 34°24′55″N 092°07′42″W, el. 249 feet (76 m)
- Clear Water Holding Pond, 34°25′18″N 092°07′13″W, el. 262 feet (80 m)
- Hardin Lake, 34°27′26″N 092°07′12″W, el. 220 feet (67 m)
- Hardin Lake Number Two, 34°27′37″N 092°06′49″W, el. 226 feet (69 m)
- Jones Lake, 34°16′58″N 092°01′41″W, el. 213 feet (65 m)
- Lake Langhofer, 34°14′11″N 091°58′05″W, el. 197 feet (60 m)
- Lake Lee, 34°17′50″N 092°02′22″W, el. 223 feet (68 m)
- Lake Pine Bluff, 34°14′15″N 092°00′31″W, el. 194 feet (59 m)
- Marks Lake, 34°06′07″N 091°52′45″W, el. 187 feet (57 m)
- Midland Lake, 34°10′12″N 092°01′36″W, el. 213 feet (65 m)
- Neely Lake, 34°10′16″N 092°03′33″W, el. 246 feet (75 m)
- Oakley Lake, 34°10′22″N 092°05′17″W, el. 253 feet (77 m)
- Phillips Lake, 34°11′42″N 091°58′53″W, el. 210 feet (64 m)
- Pool Five, 34°24′43″N 092°06′11″W, el. 197 feet (60 m)
- Pool Four, 34°14′54″N 091°54′12″W, el. 180 feet (55 m)
- Pool Three, 34°10′32″N 091°41′31″W, el. 180 feet (55 m)
- Robinson Lake, 34°11′02″N 092°11′18″W, el. 285 feet (87 m)
- Rust Lake Number One, 34°04′27″N 091°59′50″W, el. 236 feet (72 m)
- Rust Lake Number Two, 34°04′13″N 091°59′40″W, el. 246 feet (75 m)
- Shady Oaks Reservoir, 34°06′56″N 091°58′38″W, el. 207 feet (63 m)
- Suburbia Lake, 34°09′06″N 092°05′36″W, el. 259 feet (79 m)
- Surge Pond, 34°24′32″N 092°08′15″W, el. 249 feet (76 m)
- Taliaferro Lake, 34°06′56″N 091°58′38″W, el. 207 feet (63 m)
- Ta-Lo-Ha-Lake, 34°11′51″N 092°08′30″W, el. 315 feet (96 m)
- Tulley Lake, 34°19′51″N 092°05′31″W, el. 226 feet (69 m)
- Yellow Lake, 34°19′01″N 092°04′03″W, el. 200 feet (61 m)

== See also ==
- List of lakes in Arkansas
