= Mount Morris, New York (disambiguation) =

Mount Morris, New York refers to:

- Mount Morris (village), New York
- Mount Morris (town), New York
- Marcus Garvey Park, also called Mount Morris Park, in Harlem, Manhattan
- Mount Morris Park Historic District, the area surrounding Marcus Garvey Park
- Mount Morris (New York), a mountain in Adirondack Park
- Morris–Jumel Mansion, formerly Mount Morris, in Washington Heights, Manhattan
