= Tupper Lake (town), New York =

Tupper Lake, New York
- Town
- Location within the state of New York
- Coordinates: 44°09′45″N 74°28′31″W
- Country: United States
- State: New York
- County: Franklin

Government
  - Type: Town Council
  - Town Supervisor: Patricia Littlefield (R)
  - Town Administrator: Laurie Fuller (R)
  - Town Council: Members' List: • Kathy Lefebvre (D); • Shawn Skiff (R); • Michael Dechene (R); • John Quinn (D)

Area
  - Total: 130.10 sq mi (336.97 km^{2})
  - Land: 117.35 sq mi (303.93 km^{2})
  - Water: 12.75 sq mi (33.03 km^{2})
- Elevation: 1,693 ft (516 m)

Population (2020)
  - Total: 5,147
- Time zone: UTC−5 (Eastern (EST))
  - Summer (DST): UTC−4 (EDT)
- ZIP Code: 12986
- Area code: 518
- FIPS code: 36-033-75676
- GNIS feature ID: 978671
- Website: www.tupperlakeny.gov

Tupper Lake is a town in the southwest corner of Franklin County, New York, United States. The population was 5,147 at the 2020 census. The town contains a village also called Tupper Lake. Until July 2004, the town was known as "Altamont", not to be confused with the village of Altamont in Albany County.

== History ==
In 1850, the Pomeroy Lumber Company began a logging operation in the area. A clearing left by clear-cutting the forest by Raquette Pond became the site of the village of Tupper Lake. In the 1890s, a large number of buildings were erected, but in 1899 a fire burned 169 of them to the ground. As the lumber business swelled, the village of Faust became a railroad hub for the Mohawk and Malone Railway and its successor, the New York Central Railroad, and so the village of Tupper Lake prospered.

In the 1940s, the villages of Faust and Tupper Lake combined to become the village of Tupper Lake. The former village of Faust began where Main Street meets Demars Boulevard and continued west beyond the cemetery. The former village of Faust is now known as "The Junction" by the people of Tupper Lake. It was so named due to the junction of railroad lines located in Faust, lines radiating toward Malone to the north, Remsen to the southwest and the original Tupper Lake village to the southeast. The only reference left to the town of Faust is the Faust Motel, located on Main Street. The Faust Roundhouse (one of the largest buildings in the area at the time) was located behind Webb Row and near the railroad station. It burned to the ground in the 1940s.

The original railroad station in Tupper Lake Junction was built in 1895 during the community's early rapid development. It was in service for over 60 years, and the building stood for 80. The original station was torn down in 1975. In 2007, a local group of rail enthusiasts called Next Stop Tupper Lake raised $300,000 in an effort to restore scenic rail service to the area. A replica of the 1895 railroad station was built on the original site and completed by 2008. The Adirondack Railroad restored seasonal passenger rail service to the station in spring 2023. As of July 2024, the construction of new platforms at Tupper Lake Station was underway, as well as a maintenance garage, a new wye, and a walking path.

The Oval Wood Dish Corporation mill was located in the area between the villages of Faust and Tupper Lake and was originally owned by the Sisson family of Potsdam. The area encompassing the mill and the houses and apartments built across from the mill for the workers was called "Sissonville". Through neglect, the buildings eventually went to ruin and were demolished. The large smokestack bearing the letters "OWD" in the center of town still stands as an icon of Tupper Lake's lumbering past.

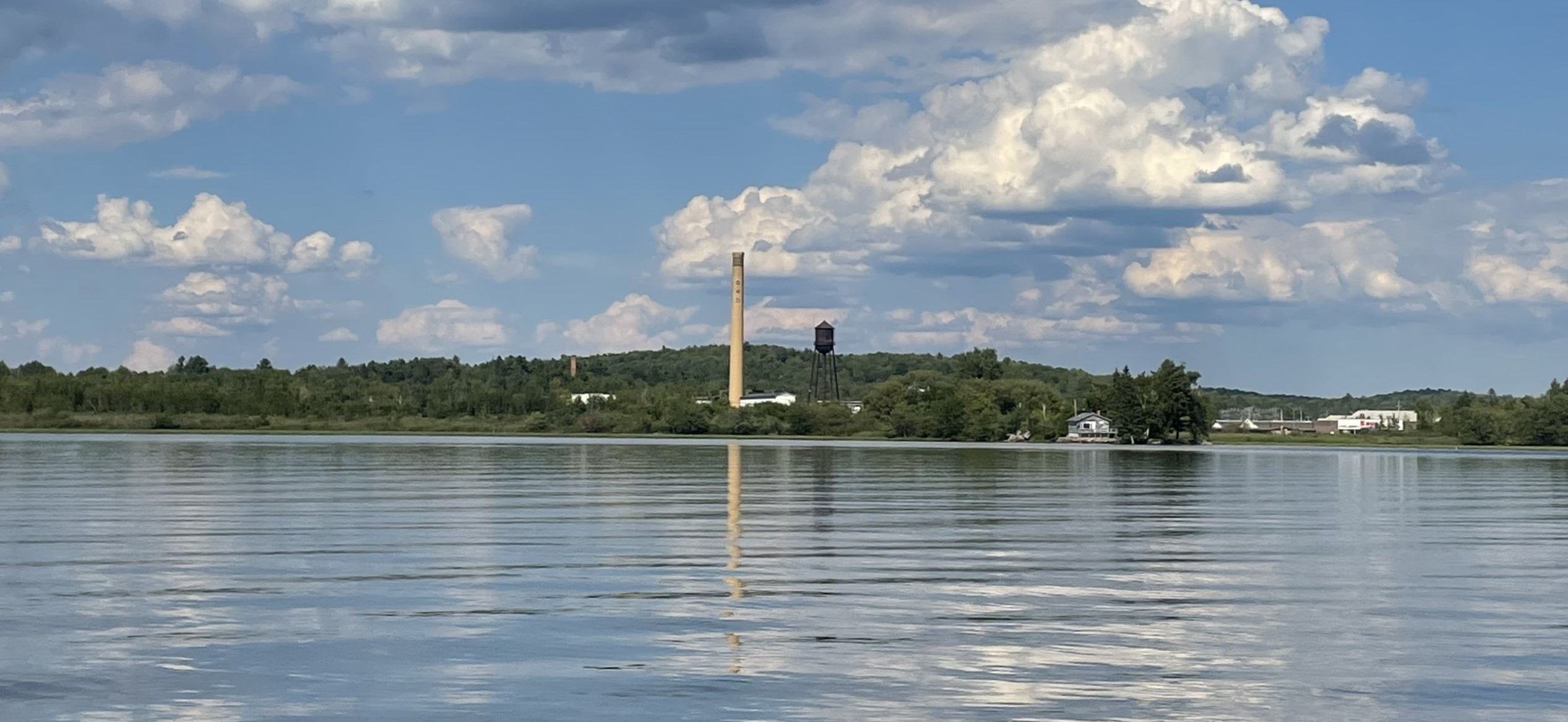
The OWD smokestack in 2022, as seen from Raquette Pond

The town of Altamont was organized in 1890 from the town of Waverly and was the last town organized in the county. In 1913, a part of St. Lawrence County was added to the town of Altamont.

In an effort to avoid confusion with the other Altamont in Albany County and to strengthen ties with the village of Tupper Lake, town councilors changed the town name from "Altamont" to "Tupper Lake" on July 16, 2004.

As of 2024, logging remained an industry in Tupper Lake, but the winter season, when roads are frozen and can support heavy logging equipment, has been growing shorter.

Tupper Lake is home to the Empire Professional Baseball League's Tupper Lake Riverpigs, who play at Tupper Lake Municipal Park.

== Geography ==
According to the United States Census Bureau, the town has a total area of 130.1 square miles (337.0 km^{2}), of which 117.3 square miles (303.9 km^{2}) is land and 12.7 square miles (33.0 km^{2}), or 9.80%, is water.

The town is inside the Adirondack Park. The southern town line is the border of Hamilton County, and the western town boundary is the border of St. Lawrence County. The town of Tupper Lake borders the towns of Harrietstown, Piercefield, Santa Clara, Waverly, and Hopkinton.

Tupper Lake is a water body in the southwestern part of the town, and crosses the county line into St. Lawrence County. The lake includes Simon Pond and Raquette Pond, upon which the village is situated.

The Raquette River, a northwestward flowing tributary of the St. Lawrence River, flows past Tupper Lake village. Water in Raquette Pond is held back by Setting Pole Dam, which is located on the river near the southwestern boundary of the town. An oxbow in the river is located near The Wild Center in the eastern portion of the town.

Other notable bodies of water in the town include Little Wolf Pond, Big Wolf Pond, Lake Madeline, Duck Lake, and Gull Pond. The municipal beach is located on Little Wolf Pond.

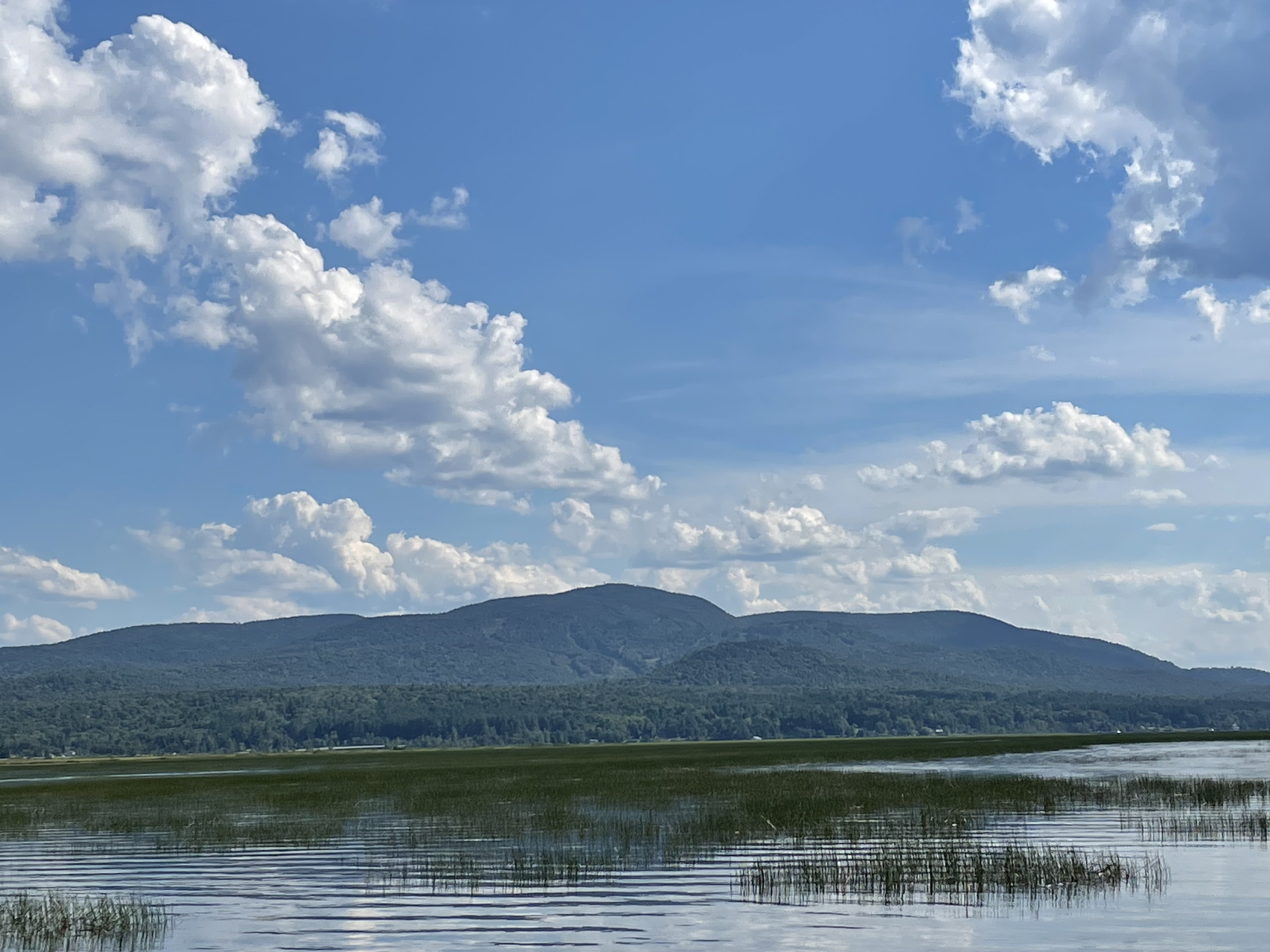
Mount Morris as seen from Raquette Pond

Mount Morris is a mountain located south of the village that was once the site of Big Tupper Ski Area. The hamlet of Moody is located at the base of the mountain. Coney Mountain and Goodman Mountain are both located in the southwestern corner of the town.

New York State Route 3 joins New York State Route 30 at Tupper Lake village; the highways are conjoined through the eastern part of the town. The Adirondack Trail Scenic Byway and Olympic Trail Scenic Byway also pass through Tupper Lake.

== Demographics ==
Historical population
Census	Pop.	Note	%±
1900	3,045		—
1910	4,691		54.1%
1920	4,927		5.0%
1930	6,097		23.7%
1940	6,537		7.2%
1950	6,849		4.8%
1960	6,546		−4.4%
1970	6,698		2.3%
1980	6,318		−5.7%
1990	6,199		−1.9%
2000	6,137		−1.0%
2010	5,971		−2.7%
2020	5,147		−13.8%
U.S. Decennial Census

As of the census of 2000, there were 6,137 people, 2,429 households, and 1,530 families residing in the town. The population density was 52.2 inhabitants per square mile (20.2/km^{2}). There were 3,118 housing units at an average density of 26.5 per square mile (10.2/km^{2}). The racial makeup of the town was 97.56% White, 1.27% African American, 0.29% Native American, 0.08% Asian, 0.08% from other races, and 0.72% from two or more races. Hispanic or Latino of any race were 0.57% of the population.

There were 2,429 households, out of which 32.0% had children under the age of 18 living with them, 46.2% were married couples living together, 12.4% had a female householder with no husband present, and 37.0% were non-families. 30.6% of all households were made up of individuals, and 14.7% had someone living alone who was 65 years of age or older. The average household size was 2.38 and the average family size was 2.97.

In the town, the population was spread out, with 24.6% under the age of 18, 7.4% from 18 to 24, 29.3% from 25 to 44, 22.0% from 45 to 64, and 16.7% who were 65 years of age or older. The median age was 38 years. For every 100 females, there were 101.7 males. For every 100 females age 18 and over, there were 95.9 males.

The median income for a household in the town was $35,636, and the median income for a family was $45,000. Males had a median income of $30,951 versus $25,938 for females. The per capita income for the town was $15,696. About 6.9% of families and 33.4% of the population were below the poverty line, including 11.8% of those under age 18 and 14.1% of those age 65 or over.

== Communities and locations in the town of Tupper Lake ==
- Derrick – A hamlet in the northern part of the town.
- Duck Lake – A lake by the southern town line.
- Kildare – A hamlet near the western town line, northwest of Tupper Lake village.
- Lake Madeleine – A lake near the southern town boundary, north of Duck Lake.
- Litchfield Park – A location in the southwestern corner of Tupper Lake.
- Massawepie
- Moody – A hamlet south of Tupper Lake village on NY-30. It was the first settled community in the town.
- Piercefield Flow – A widening of the Raquette River at the western town line.
- Raquette Pond – An arm of Tupper Lake adjacent to Tupper Lake village. It is a widening of the Raquette River created by a dam.
- Simon Pond – An arm of Tupper Lake south of Tupper Lake village. Oddly, the road along its south shore is named Lake Simond Road.
- Tupper Lake – The Village of Tupper Lake is located in the south-central part of the town.
- Tupper Lake Junction – Previously known as Faust, an area of the Village on Main Street near the railroad.
- Wolf Pond – A lake north of Tupper Lake village. There are actually two ponds: Little Wolf Pond and the more northerly Big Wolf Pond, joined at a narrow channel.

== Notable person ==
- Roger Allen LaPorte, Vietnam War protester, immolated himself in front of the United Nations building
