= Mount Morris (New York) =

Mountain in New York, United States

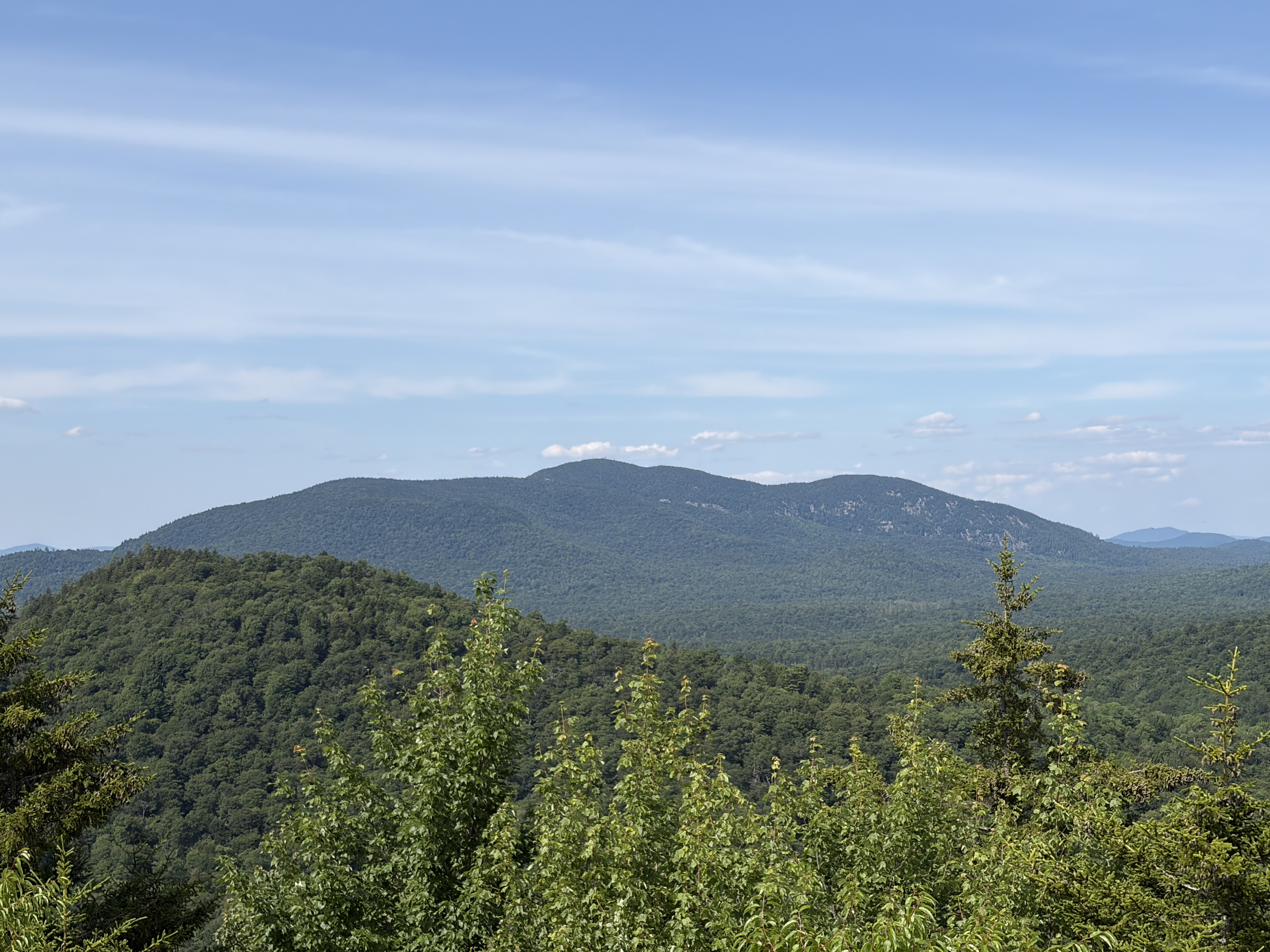
- Mount Morris pictured from Coney Mountain

Highest point
- Elevation: 3,117 feet (950 m)
- Coordinates: 44°09′34″N 74°28′31″W

Geography
- Location within New York Adirondack Park Location within the United States
- Location: SSW of Tupper Lake, Franklin County, New York, U.S.
- Topo map: USGS Tupper Lake

Mount Morris is a 3,117-foot-tall (950 m) mountain located in Adirondack Mountains of New York. It is located in the south-southwest of the village of Tupper Lake in Franklin County, and is "the highest peak immediately east of Tupper Lake." It is named after the town in which it was then located.

In 1919, a 22-foot-tall (6.7 m) steel fire lookout tower was built on the summit. The tower ceased fire lookout operations in 1971. Ownership of the tower was later transferred to the town and is closed to the public.

== History ==
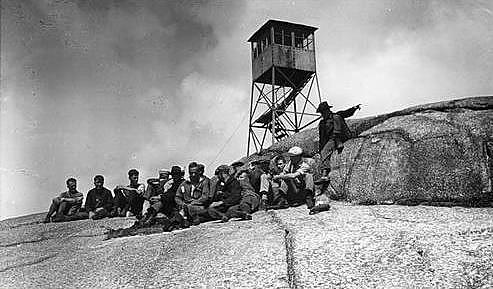
Mount Morris NY, firetower 1922

Mount Morris was first climbed by Verplanck Colvin in 1870, and selected as a station for his survey of the Adirondacks. The first signal station for the survey was built in 1882. A new signal station was built in 1896.

In July 1909, a fire observation station was built but no tower was needed due to an unobstructed view from the summit. In 1919, a 22-foot-tall (6.7 m) Aermotor LS40 tower was built on the summit. Due to increased use of aerial detection, the tower ceased fire lookout operations at the end of the 1971 season. In the late 1970's, ownership of the tower was transferred to the town of Altamont (now known as Tupper Lake), which uses the cabin for their ski center operations. The tower also has several radio antennas attached to it.

== Geology ==
Colvin described the top of the mountain as "whitish on the surface and light brown within; and appears to be compact crystalline gneiss." The western slopes are precambrian granite named "Morris Granite."
