= Bridge Brook Pond =

Lake in St. Lawrence County, New York, United States

- Location within New York Bridge Brook Pond (the United States)
- Location: St. Lawrence County, New York, United States
- Coordinates: 44°09′48″N 74°35′01″W
- Basin countries: United States
- Surface area: 183 acres (0.74 km^{2})
- Average depth: 8 feet (2.4 m)
- Max. depth: 25 feet (7.6 m)
- Shore length^{1}: 3.7 miles (6.0 km)
- Surface elevation: 1,594 feet (486 m)
- Islands: 6
- Settlements: Mount Arab, New York
- ^{1} Shore length is not a well-defined measure.

Bridge Brook Pond is located southeast of Mount Arab, New York. Fish species present in the lake are white sucker, brook trout, and black bullhead. There is trail access from the west shore of Tupper Lake.
