= Childwold, New York =

- Hamlet
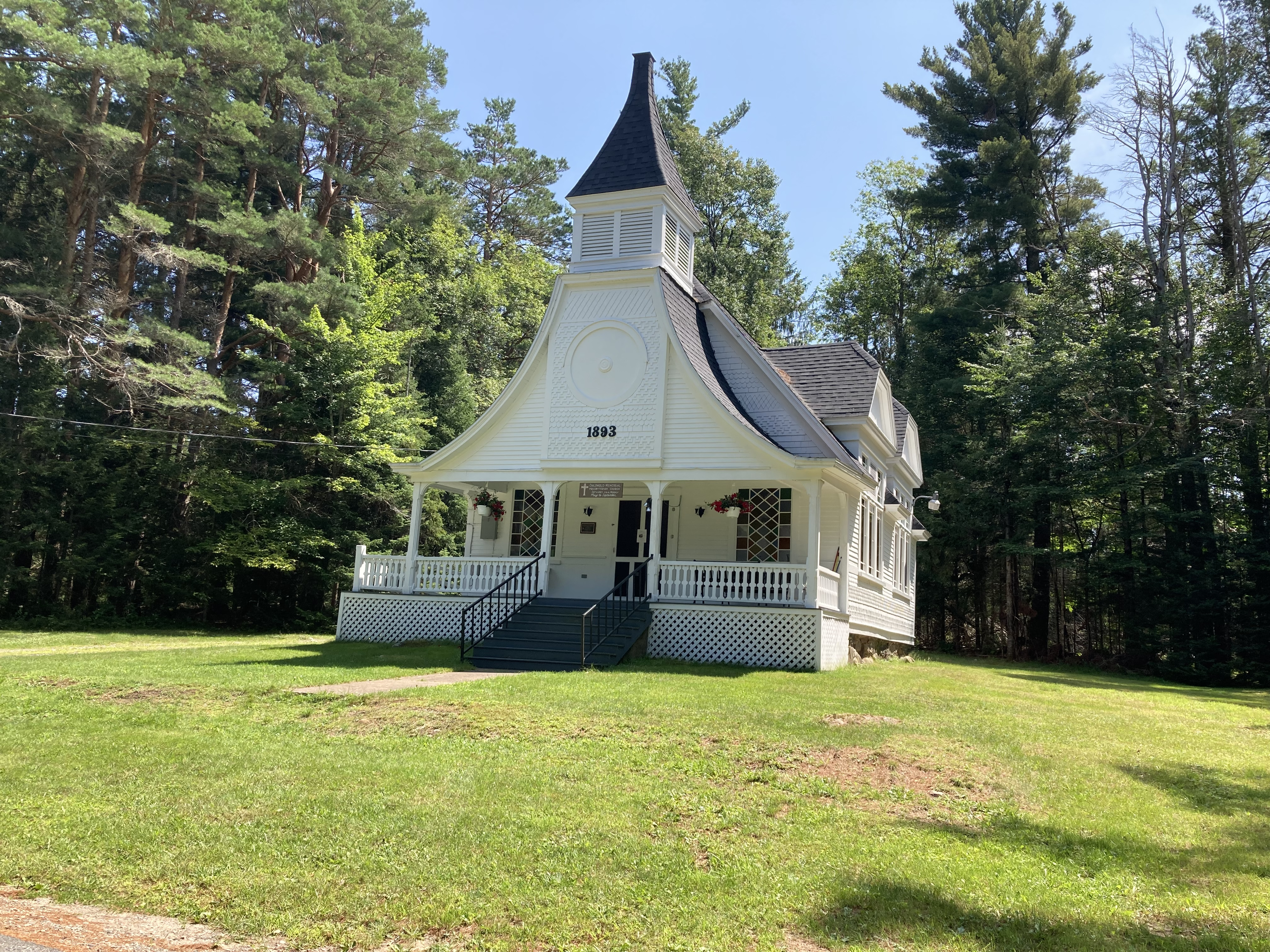
- The Childwold Memorial Presbyterian Church in the hamlet of Childwold

- Location within New York Location within the United States
- Coordinates: 44°17′11″N 74°39′48″W
- Country: United States
- State: New York
- County: St. Lawrence
- Elevation: 1,627 ft (496 m)
- Time zone: UTC-5 (Eastern (EST))
  - Summer (DST): UTC-4 (EDT)
- ZIP code: 12922
- Area codes: 518 & 838
- GNIS feature ID: 976124

Childwold is a hamlet in St. Lawrence County, New York, United States. The community is located along New York State Route 3, 10.8 miles (17.4 km) west-northwest of Tupper Lake. Childwold has a post office with ZIP code 12922.
