= Mount Arab =

Mountain in New York, United States

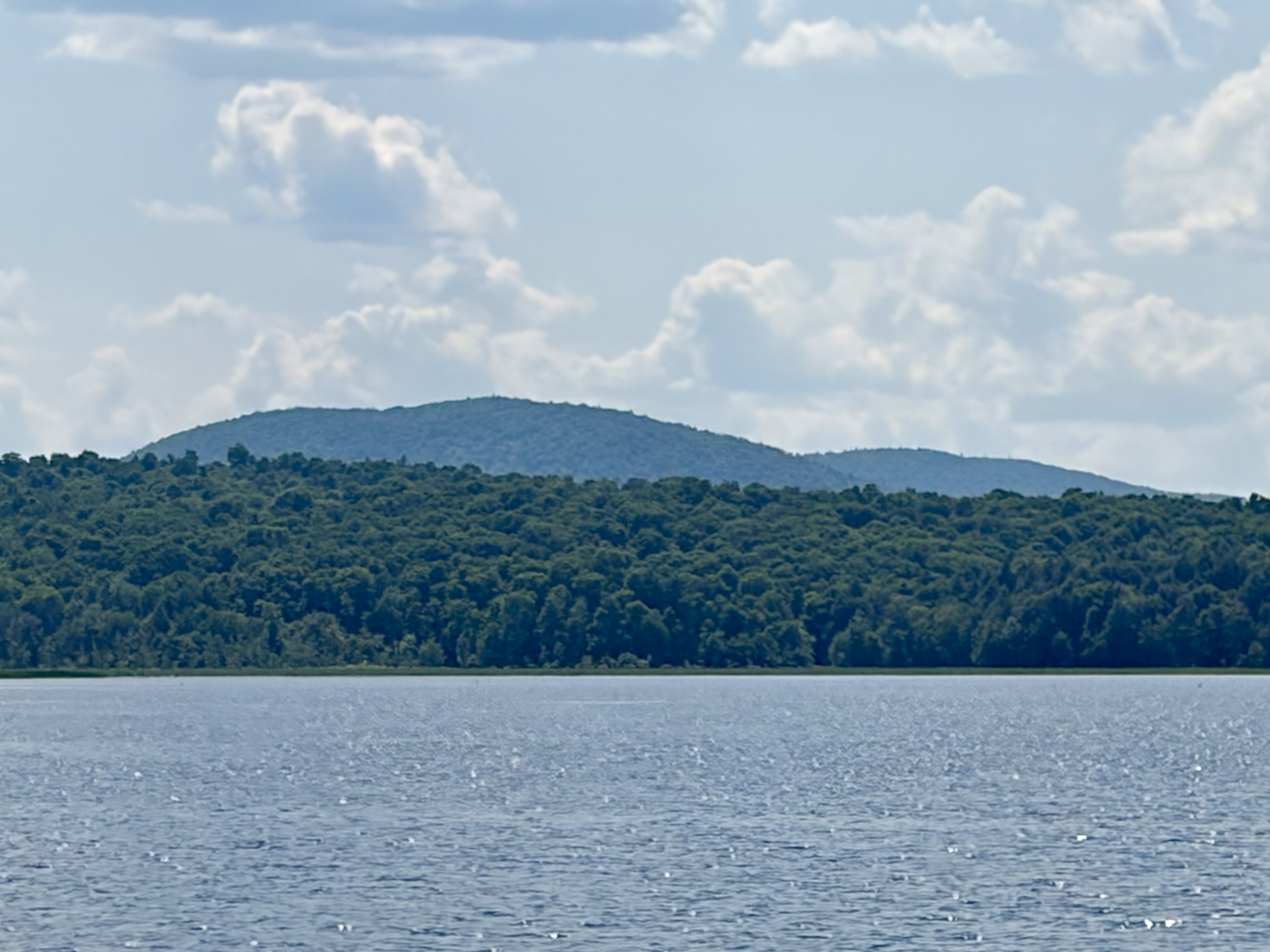
- Mount Arab viewed from Tupper Lake

Highest point
- Elevation: 2,533 ft (772 m)
- Coordinates: 44°12′15″N 74°35′07″W

Geography
- Location within New York Adirondack Park Location within the United States
- Location: Piercefield, St. Lawrence County, New York, U.S.
- Parent range: Adirondacks
- Topo map: USGS Piercefield

Mount Arab, sometimes known as Arab Mountain, is a 2,533-foot-tall (772 m) mountain located in the town of Piercefield, New York, in the northern part of the Adirondack Mountain Range. At the summit of this mountain is a large fire tower and a ranger station known as the Arab Mountain Fire Observation Station. Because hiking to the summit of this mountain does not take very long and because it offers excellent views of the surrounding mountains and lakes, it is an extremely popular location for tourists and hikers of the Northern Adirondacks.

Mount Arab is also a small hamlet in the southern part of the town, just outside the hamlet of Conifer.
