= Horseshoe Lake (St. Lawrence County, New York) =

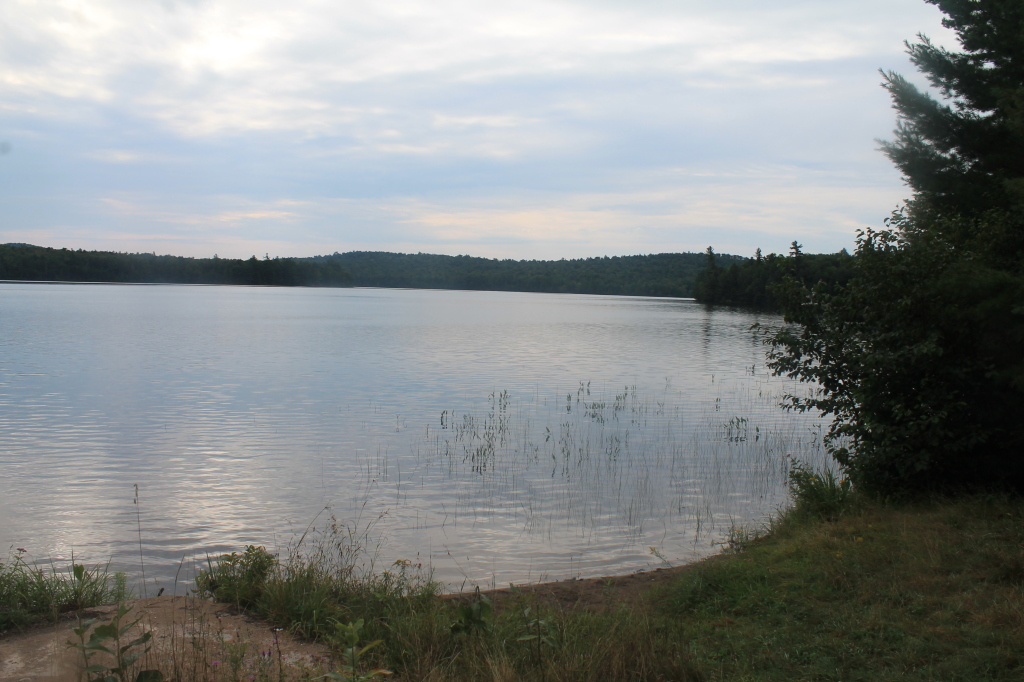
- The lake in 2012

- Location within New York
- Location: St. Lawrence County, New York
- Coordinates: 44°07′54″N 74°37′15″W, 44°07′58″N 74°37′37″W, 44°07′29″N 74°37′15″W
- Type: Lake
- Basin countries: United States
- Surface area: 384 acres (1.55 km^{2})
- Average depth: 9 feet (2.7 m)
- Max. depth: 16 feet (4.9 m)
- Shore length^{1}: 3.9 miles (6.3 km)
- Surface elevation: 1,729 feet (527 m)
- Settlements: Horseshoe, New York
- ^{1} Shore length is not a well-defined measure.

Horseshoe Lake is located in the Horseshoe Lake Wild Forest near Piercefield, New York. There are three carry down access sites. Two are located on the west shore off Route 421, and the other is on the southeast shore off Route 421. Fish species in the lake are tiger muskie, walleye, white sucker, yellow perch and black bullhead.
