= Childwold Memorial Presbyterian Church =

Historic church in New York, United States

- U.S. National Register of Historic Places
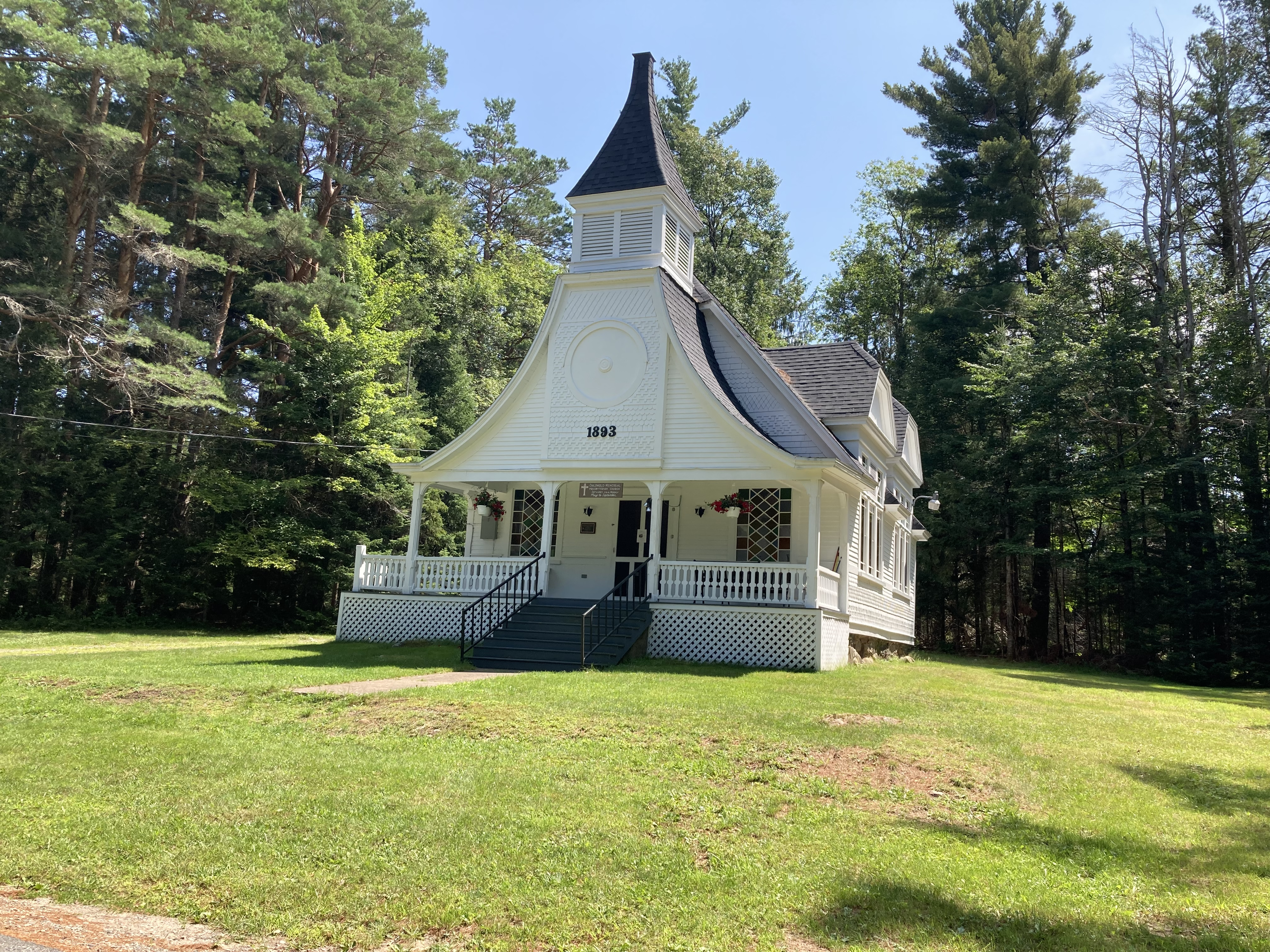

- Location within New York Location within the United States
- Location: Bancroft Rd., Piercefield, New York
- Coordinates: 44°17′5″N 74°40′9″W
- Area: less than one acre
- Built: 1903
- Architect: Pond, William A.
- Architectural style: Queen Anne
- NRHP reference No.: 01000585
- Added to NRHP: May 30, 2001

Childwold Memorial Presbyterian Church is a historic Presbyterian church located the hamlet of Childwold in the town of Piercefield, St. Lawrence County, New York. Built as part of a summer resort community, the church included several unusual architectural characteristics and is listed on the National Register of Historic Places.

== History ==
The Childwold Presbyterian Church was built as part of a resort development project in 1893. It was one of 17 Presbyterian churches founded in Franklin and St. Lawrence counties by minister Richard G. McCarthy.

== Architecture ==
The church is a small, rectangular one story Queen Anne adaptation, approximately 25 feet wide and 42 feet long. The church includes several elements that were unusual at the time, including large window bays on each side are topped by clipped gables and a front porch spanning the building's full width. The exterior included multicolored shingle patterns, including a prominent rounded design on the steeple resembling a rose window. It is a condensed version of the First Presbyterian Church in Saranac Lake, built around the same time.

== Preservation ==
The Childwold church, still in use, is a rare surviving example of Addison Child's development activities in the region. It was listed on the National Register of Historic Places in 2001.
