= Little Trout Pond =

Lake in St. Lawrence County, New York, USA

- Location within New York Little Trout Pond (the United States)
- Location: St. Lawrence County, New York
- Coordinates: 44°05′45″N 74°39′06″W
- Type: Lake
- Basin countries: United States
- Surface area: 45 acres (0.18 km^{2})
- Average depth: 27 feet (8.2 m)
- Max. depth: 66 feet (20 m)
- Shore length^{1}: 1.1 miles (1.8 km)
- Surface elevation: 1,755 feet (535 m)
- Settlements: Horseshoe, New York
- ^{1} Shore length is not a well-defined measure.

Little Trout Pond is a lake located south of Horseshoe, New York. Fish species present in the lake are white sucker, lake trout, yellow perch, brook trout, and black bullhead. Access by bushwhack trail from Trout Pond on southeast shore.
