= Arab Mountain Fire Observation Station =

- U.S. National Register of Historic Places
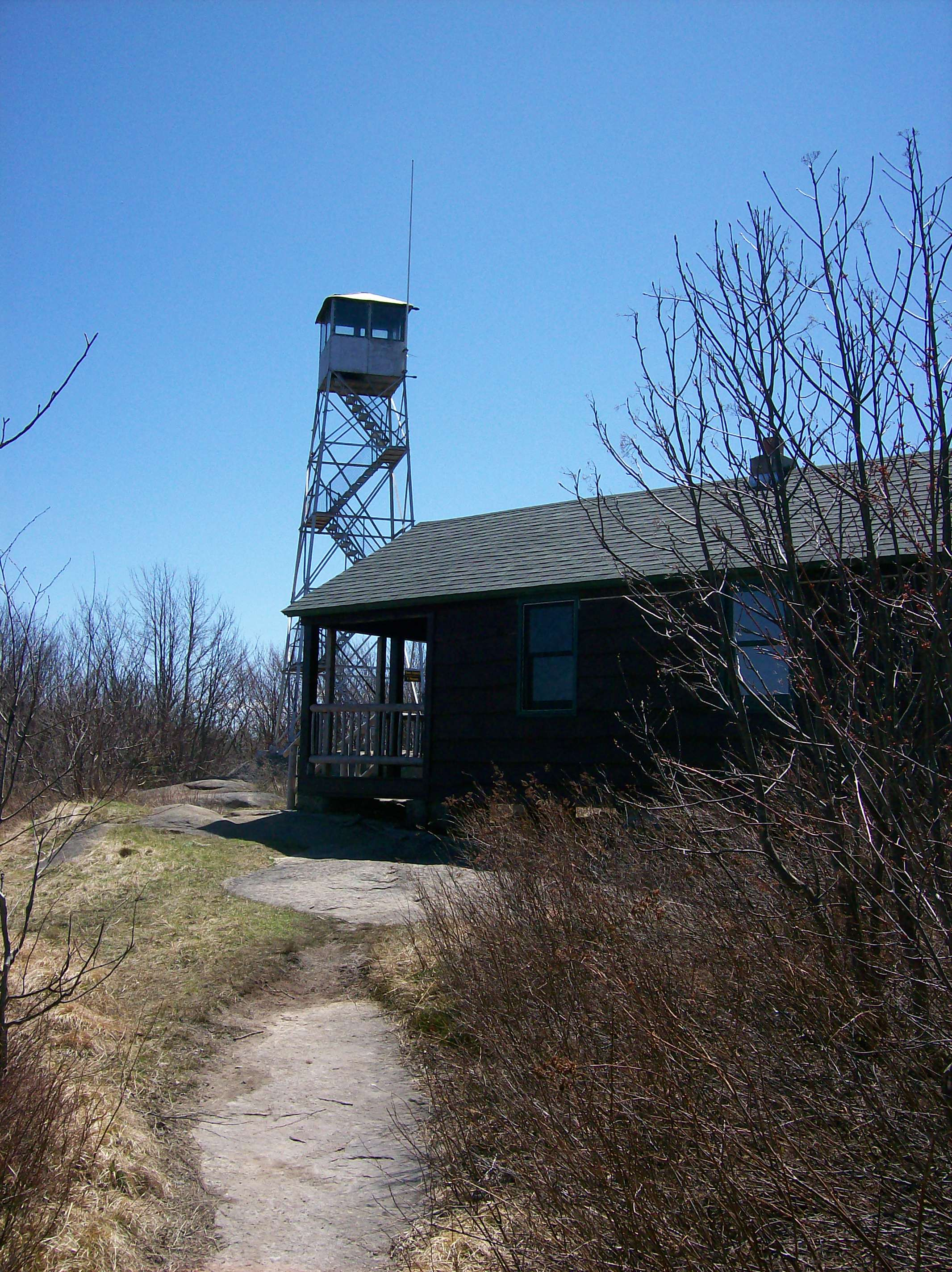
- Arab Mountain Fire Observation Station, May 2007

- Location within New York Location within the United States
- Location: Arab Mountain, Piercefield, New York
- Coordinates: 44°12′47″N 74°35′48″W
- Area: 3.7 acres (1.5 ha)
- Built: 1918
- Architect: Aermotor Corporation
- MPS: Fire Observation Stations of New York State Forest Preserve MPS
- NRHP reference No.: 01001039
- Added to NRHP: September 23, 2001

The Arab Mountain Fire Observation Station is a historic fire observation station located on Mount Arab at Piercefield in St. Lawrence County, New York. The station includes a 40-foot-tall (12 m), steel frame lookout tower erected in 1918, an observers cabin built about 1948, a trace of the foundation of the original cabin, a structure probably used as a root cellar in the 1940s, and the foot trail. The tower is a prefabricated structure built by the Aermotor Corporation and provided a front line of defense in preserving the Adirondack Forest Preserve from the hazards of forest fires.

It was listed on the National Register of Historic Places in 2001.
