= Trout Pond (New York) =

- Location within New York Trout Pond (the United States)
- Location: St. Lawrence County, New York
- Coordinates: 44°05′43″N 74°38′25″W
- Type: Lake
- Basin countries: United States
- Surface area: 157 acres (0.64 km^{2})
- Average depth: 22 feet (6.7 m)
- Max. depth: 83 feet (25 m)
- Shore length^{1}: 3.7 miles (6.0 km)
- Surface elevation: 1,778 feet (542 m)
- Settlements: Horseshoe, New York
- ^{1} Shore length is not a well-defined measure.

Trout Pond is a lake located south of Horseshoe, New York. Fish species present in the lake are white sucker, yellow perch, large mouth bass, Northern pike and black bullhead. Access by trail from southwest of County Route 10.

== See also ==
- Little Trout Pond
