= Horseshoe Pond (Piercefield, St. Lawrence County, New York) =

- Location within New York Horseshoe Pond (the United States)
- Location: St. Lawrence County, New York, United States
- Coordinates: 44°14′49″N 74°38′47″W
- Type: Lake
- Basin countries: United States
- Surface area: 29 acres (0.12 km^{2})
- Average depth: 15 feet (4.6 m)
- Max. depth: 44 feet (13 m)
- Shore length^{1}: 1.6 miles (2.6 km)
- Surface elevation: 1,529 feet (466 m)
- Settlements: Gale, New York
- ^{1} Shore length is not a well-defined measure.

Horseshoe Pond is a lake located by Gale, New York. The outlet creek flows north into Long Pond, then continues into Catamount Pond. Fish species present in the lake are white sucker, smallmouth bass, brook trout, rock bass, yellow perch, and black bullhead. Access on north and west shore off Massawepie Road. Permit is required from June to August from the Boy Scout camp.
