= Tupper Lake Central School District =

School district in the U.S. state of New York

Tupper Lake Central Schools

Location
- Tupper Lake, New York United States

District information
- Motto: Where Excellence Is No Accident
- Superintendent: Jaycee Welsh
- Schools: 2

Students and staff
- District mascot: Lumberjack
- Colors: Red and Black

Other information
- Website: www.tupperlakecsd.net

Tupper Lake Central School District is a school district in Tupper Lake, New York, United States. The superintendent is Russell Bartlett. The district operates two schools: Tupper Lake Middle High School and L.P. Quinn Elementary School.

== Administration ==
As of 2026, the superintendent is Jaycee Welsh.

=== Selected Former Superintendents ===
Previous assignment and reason for departure denoted in parentheses

- Michael A. Hunsinger – 1994–2005 (Superintendent - Waterloo Central School District, retired)
- Daniel Bower – 2005–2006

== Tupper Lake Middle/High School ==
Tupper Lake Middle/High School
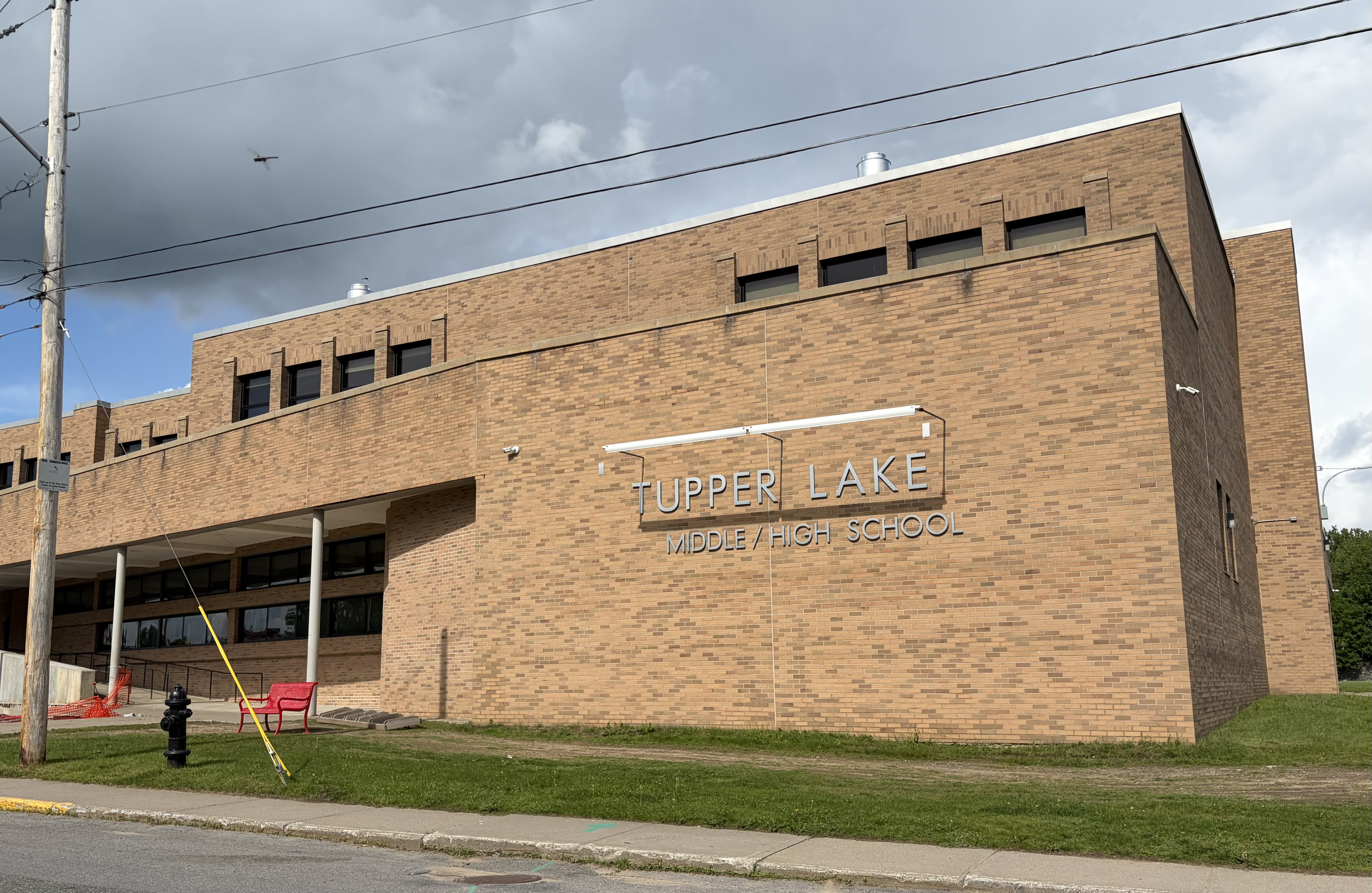
- Tupper Lake Middle/High School in 2026

Information
- Principal: Chris Savage
- Grades: 7-12
- Language: English
- Hours in school day: 6
- Athletic Director: Hayden Lamere
- Website: Tupper Lake Middle Senior High

Tupper Lake Middle-High School serves grades 7 through 12. The current principal is Mr. Chris Savage

=== Selected former principals ===
Previous assignment and reason for departure denoted in parentheses

- James Ellis 1977-1996
- Paul J. Alioto 1996 - 2000
- Michael Powers 2000 - 2001
- Eugene "Gene" H. Johnson Jr. 2001 - 2004
- Pam Martin 2004 - 2011

== L.P. Quinn Elementary School ==
L.P. Quinn Elementary School

Information
- Type: Public, Coeducational
- Principal: Elizabeth Littlefield
- Grades: K-6
- Hours in school day: 6
- Website: Tupper Lake Elementary School

L.P. Elementary School serves grades K through 6. The current principal is Elizabeth Littlefield
