= Catamount Pond =

- Location within New York Catamount Pond (the United States)
- Location: St. Lawrence County, New York, United States
- Coordinates: 44°15′50″N 74°38′03″W
- Type: Lake
- Basin countries: United States
- Surface area: 107 acres (0.43 km^{2})
- Average depth: 6 feet (1.8 m)
- Max. depth: 10 feet (3.0 m)
- Shore length^{1}: 2 miles (3.2 km)
- Surface elevation: 1,516 feet (462 m)
- Settlements: Gale, New York
- ^{1} Shore length is not a well-defined measure.

Catamount Pond is a lake located by Gale, New York. The outlet creek flows into Massawepie Lake. Fish species present in the lake are white sucker, smallmouth bass, brook trout, rock bass, yellow perch, and black bullhead.
