= The Wild Center =

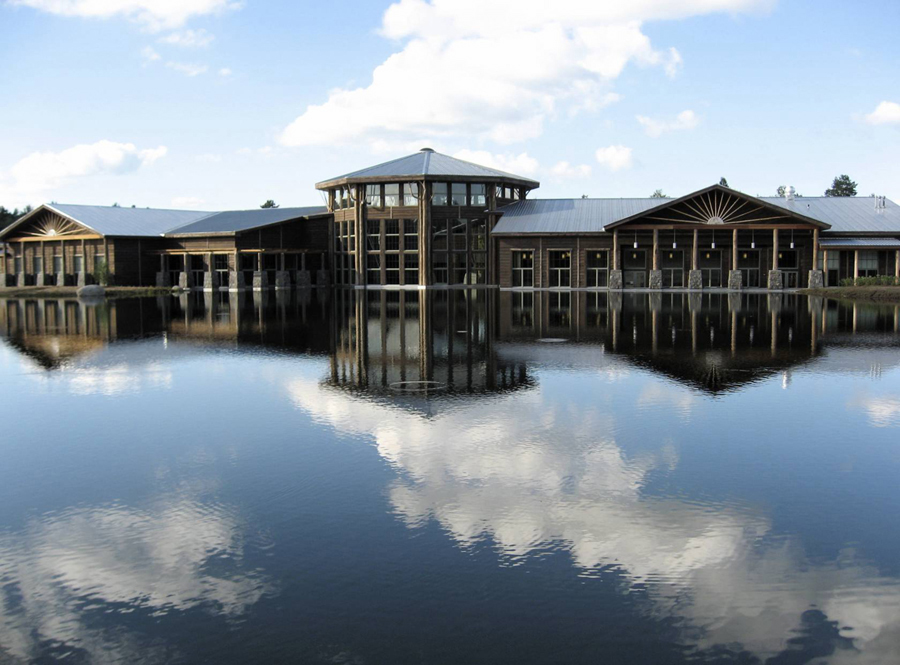
- The Wild Center viewed from Rainbow Bridge
- Former name: Natural History Museum of the Adirondacks
- Established: 2006
- Location: Tupper Lake, New York
- Coordinates: 44.219709°N 74.438543°W
- Type: Science museum
- Director: Stephanie Ratcliffe
- Website: www.wildcenter.org

The center's previous logo

Sign at main entrance to museum campus

The Wild Center, formerly known as the Natural History Museum of the Adirondacks, is a natural history center in Tupper Lake, New York, near the center of New York state's Adirondack Park.

== History ==
The Wild Center was founded as the Natural History Museum of the Adirondacks in 1998 by Elizabeth Lowe. The town of Tupper Lake donated a 31-acre (13 ha) site on the Raquette River on the east end of the village for the museum. A site plan was completed in 1999; site development began in 2002 and construction in 2004. The museum opened in 2006. In 2015, the outdoor Wild Walk exhibit that had been part of the original plan opened to the public.

== Exhibits ==
The center mixes up the indoors and outdoors on a trail-filled 115-acre (470,000 m^{2}) campus. The center opened Wild Walk in 2015, a thousand feet of bridges and platforms that rise up and eventually over the forest on the center's campus. In addition to the outdoor experiences there are five primary indoor exhibit areas, The Pataki Hall of the Adirondacks contains The Living River Trail that circles the hall with live animal exhibits and a waterfall with the center's live otters. There are approximately 50 species of live animals at the center, many of them in habitats in this hall. The Big Wolf Great Hall contains a lean-to and the glacial ice wall and is the site for the center's live animal encounters. The Naturalist Cabinet contains hands-on exhibits and collections. Other exhibit areas include the Flammer Panoramas Theater where films are screened, and Planet Adirondacks, an installation of the NOAA's Science on a Sphere with shows focusing on the relationship between the Adirondacks and the rest of the Earth. The center features live exhibits and live animals, including river otters, birds, amphibians and fish. Indoors, a marsh appears to flow into a real pond that laps at the outside of the building, and the calls of live owls and otters mix with the splashing cascade of a trout-filled indoor stream. High definition films in a wide-screen theater explore the region and showcase fascinating reports from field scientists researching everything from moose to loons to alpine summits.

The center also includes outdoor exhibits that take visitors into the ecosystems that surround the center. There are canoe trips available on the river that runs through its campus. Daily guided trail walks are also offered. The walks are on provided snow shoes in the winter.

== Awards ==
The center was named a 2015 finalist for the National Medal, the nation's highest honor for museums in service of their communities. This center is the first LEED museum in New York. It earned a silver LEED award from the U.S. Green Building Council. The center has an extensive exhibit that details the LEED aspects of its facility.

== Programs ==
The center plays a role in a range of Adirondack projects, sponsoring a community maple sugar operation, sponsoring an annual youth summit that brings college and high school students together to research climate impacts and develop campus action plans. It has partnered in this effort with the Association of Science and Technology Centers (ASTC), and Heureka Science Center in Finland.

== Architecture ==
The building and the exhibits were designed by The Office of Charles P. Reay with Fish Partners and the St. Louis architectural firm Hellmuth, Obata and Kassabaum. The Bio Building was designed by local architecture firm Phinney Design Group, based in Saratoga Springs. It opened on July 4, 2006. The design and experience of Wild Walk has been compared to the spiral ramp of the Guggenheim Museum and the High Line in Manhattan.

== See also ==
- Adirondack Experience
