= Piercefield, New York =

- Town
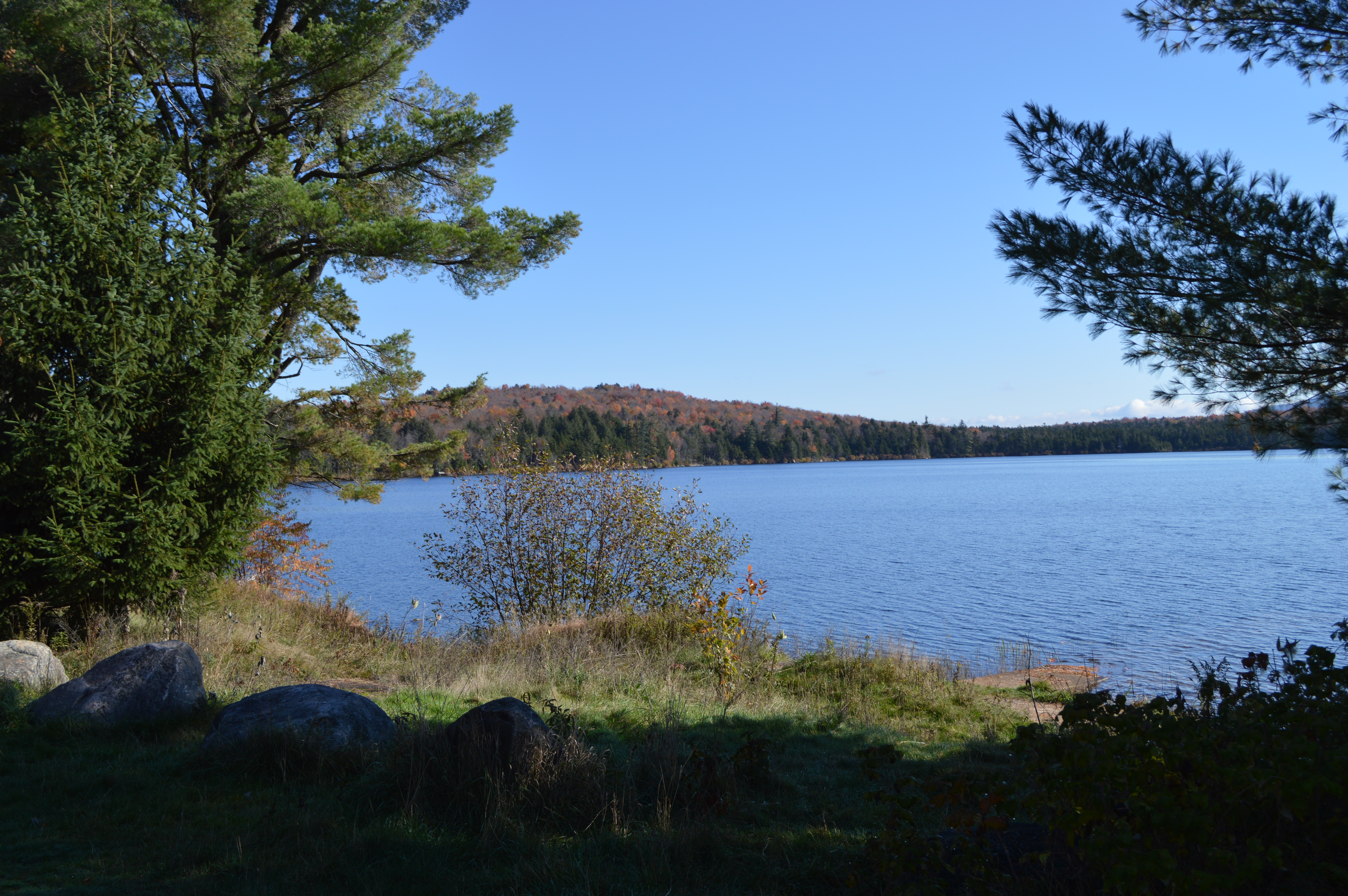
- Lakeside view in Piercefield

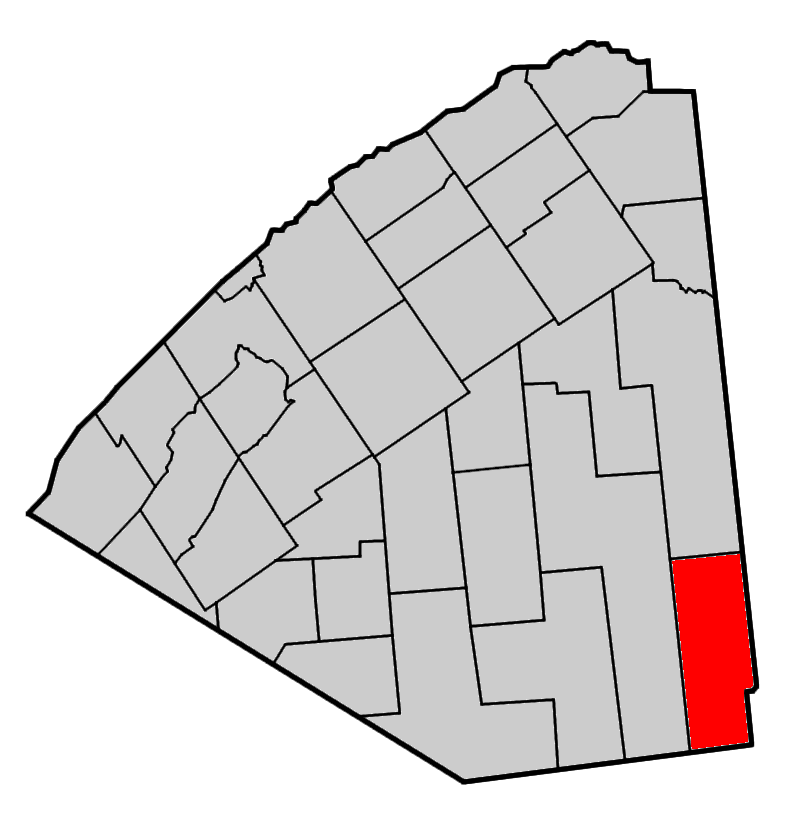
- Map highlighting Piercefield's location within St. Lawrence County.

- Location within the state of New York
- Coordinates: 44°13′56″N 74°34′35″W
- Country: United States
- State: New York
- County: St. Lawrence

Area
  - Total: 111.07 sq mi (287.66 km^{2})
  - Land: 104.15 sq mi (269.76 km^{2})
  - Water: 6.91 sq mi (17.90 km^{2})
- Elevation: 1,600 ft (500 m)

Population (2020)
  - Total: 282
  - Density: 2.8/sq mi (1.1/km^{2})
- Time zone: UTC-5 (Eastern (EST))
  - Summer (DST): UTC-4 (EDT)
- FIPS code: 36-57716
- GNIS feature ID: 0979364
- Website: https://www.piercefield.org/

Piercefield is a town in St. Lawrence County, New York, United States. The population was 310 at the 2010 census.

The Town of Piercefield is in the southeastern corner of the county and is southeast of Canton.

== History ==
The area of Piercefield town was first settled as in the early 1800s. The town was organized from part of Hopkinton town in 1900. The 1933 closing of the International Paper factory led to an economic downturn in the town.

Residents of the area included Abbot Augustus Low who resided in an area known as Horseshoe.

The Arab Mountain Fire Observation Station and Childwold Memorial Presbyterian Church are listed on the National Register of Historic Places.

== Geography ==
According to the United States Census Bureau, the town has a total area of 111.1 square miles (288 km^{2}), of which 104.3 square miles (270 km^{2}) is land and 6.8 square miles (18 km^{2}) (6.12%) is water.

The eastern town line is the border of Franklin County and the southern town line is the boundary of Hamilton County.

The town is within the Adirondack Park.

The Raquette River flows through the town, and the southwestern part of Tupper Lake is inside the town.

At 2,688 feet of elevation, Mount Matumbla is the highest point in St. Lawrence County. The mountain is located Northeast of the hamlet of Piercefield. "Matumbla" is assumed to either be derived from the aboriginal name or to be an anglicization of the name "Montagne Bleue" (Blue Mountain) given by the original French settlers. New York State Route 3 is a highway connecting the northern and southern sections of the town. New York State Route 421 is a short highway in the southeastern part of Piercefield.

== Demographics ==
Historical population
| Census | Pop. | Note | %± |
|---|---|---|---|
| 1910 | 770 | | — |
| 1920 | 1,454 | | 88.8% |
| 1930 | 1,330 | | −8.5% |
| 1940 | 667 | | −49.8% |
| 1950 | 554 | | −16.9% |
| 1960 | 420 | | −24.2% |
| 1970 | 422 | | 0.5% |
| 1980 | 365 | | −13.5% |
| 1990 | 285 | | −21.9% |
| 2000 | 305 | | 7.0% |
| 2010 | 310 | | 1.6% |
| 2020 | 282 | | −9.0% |

As of the census of 2000, there were 305 people, 136 households, and 88 families residing in the town. The population density was 2.9 inhabitants per square mile (1.1/km^{2}). There were 417 housing units at an average density of 4.0 per square mile (1.5/km^{2}). The racial makeup of the town was 97.70% White, 0.33% Native American, 0.66% Asian, 0.33% from other races, and 0.98% from two or more races. Hispanic or Latino of any race were 0.98% of the population.

There were 136 households, out of which 22.1% had children under the age of 18 living with them, 55.9% were married couples living together, 5.9% had a female householder with no husband present, and 34.6% were non-families. 29.4% of all households were made up of individuals, and 14.0% had someone living alone who was 65 years of age or older. The average household size was 2.24 and the average family size was 2.78.

In the town, the population was spread out, with 20.0% under the age of 18, 3.6% from 18 to 24, 25.2% from 25 to 44, 32.5% from 45 to 64, and 18.7% who were 65 years of age or older. The median age was 46 years. For every 100 females, there were 103.3 males. For every 100 females age 18 and over, there were 100.0 males.

The median income for a household in the town was $34,643, and the median income for a family was $36,250. Males had a median income of $24,583 versus $27,083 for females. The per capita income for the town was $16,635. About 7.8% of families and 8.3% of the population were below the poverty line, including 10.1% of those under the age of eighteen and 9.8% of those 65 or over.

Town of Piercefield sign

== Communities and locations in Piercefield ==
- Bridge Brook Pond – A lake located southeast of the hamlet of Mount Arab.
- Catamount Pond – A lake adjacent to Gale.
- Childwold – A hamlet northwest of Piercefield village on NY-3, near the western town line.
- Childwood Station – A location south of Piercefield village.
- Conifer-- A hamlet southwest of Piercefield village.
- Eagle Crag Lake – A small lake west of the Mount Arab community.
- Gale – A hamlet on NY-3, northwest of Piercefield village.
- Horseshoe – A hamlet in the southwestern part of the town, southwest of Mount Arab.
- Horseshoe Lake – A lake located east of the hamlet of Horseshoe.
- Horseshoe Pond – A pond located east of Massawepie Lake.
- Little Trout Pond – A pond partially located in the southwestern corner of the town. The other part of the pond is in the town of Colton.
- Long Pond – A pond located east of Massawepie Lake.
- Massawepie Lake – A lake located southeast of Gale.
- Mount Arab – (1) A hamlet in the southern part of the town, south of Conifer, and (2) An elevation south of Piercefield village, famous for hiking.
- Mount Arab Lake – A small lake northwest of the Mount Arab community.
- Mount Arab Station – A location north of Mount Arab.
- Piercefield – The hamlet of Piercefield is on NY_3 by the Raquette River and Piercefield Flow near the center of the town.
- Piercefield Flow – A lake formed in a wide section of the Raquette River.
- Trout Pond – A lake by the southern town line. Partially in the town of Colton.
