= Tupper Lake, New York =

- Village
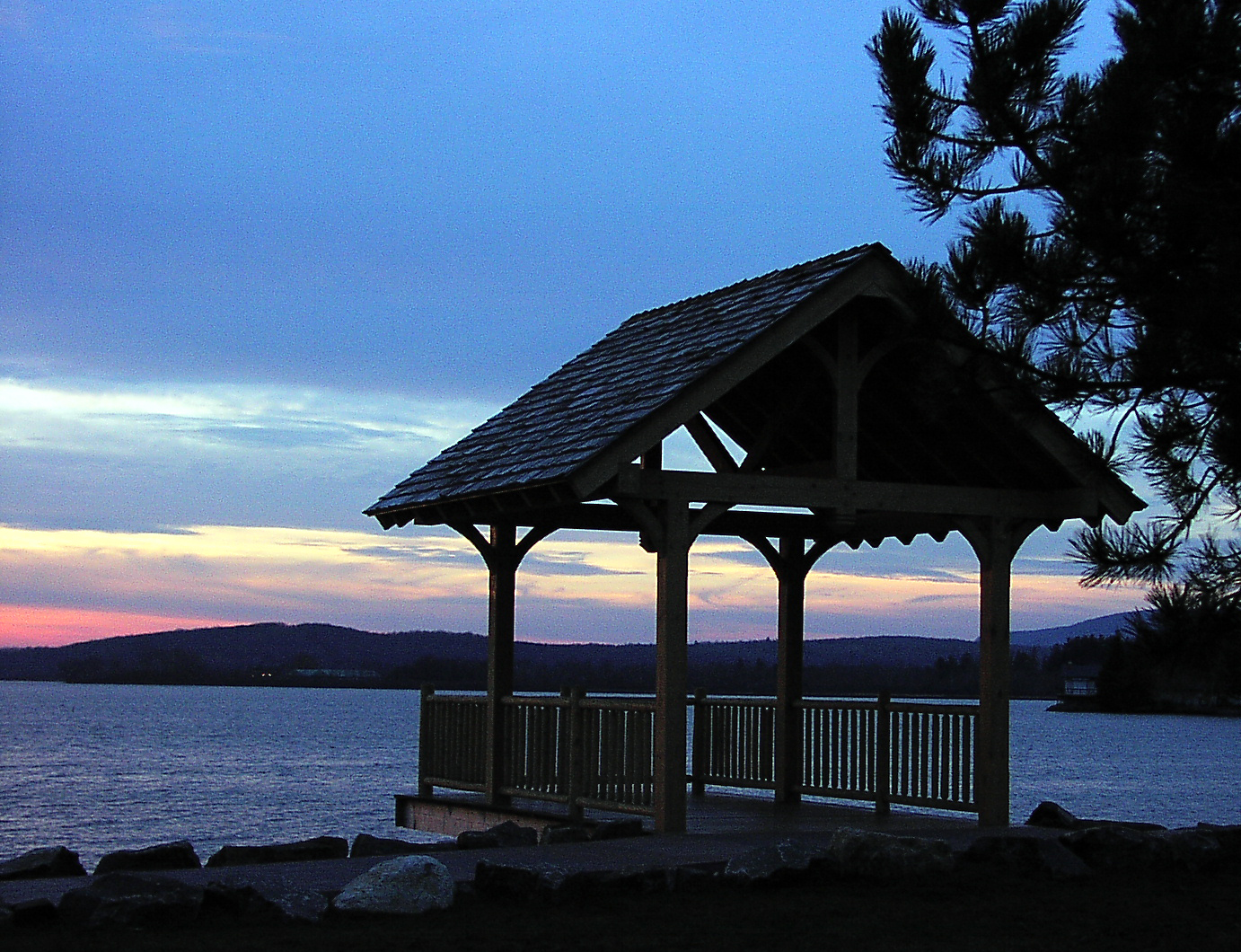
- Raquette Pond

- Location within the state of New York
- Coordinates: 44°14′0″N 74°27′57″W
- Country: United States
- State: New York
- County: Franklin County

Area
  - Total: 2.14 sq mi (5.53 km^{2})
  - Land: 2.09 sq mi (5.42 km^{2})
  - Water: 0.042 sq mi (0.11 km^{2})
- Elevation: 1,545 ft (471 m)

Population (2020)
  - Total: 3,282
  - Density: 1,569.4/sq mi (605.94/km^{2})
- Time zone: UTC-5 (Eastern (EST))
  - Summer (DST): UTC-4 (EDT)
- ZIP code: 12986
- Area code: 518
- FIPS code: 36-75671
- GNIS feature ID: 977539
- Website: www.tupperlakeny.gov

Tupper Lake is a village in Franklin County, New York, United States. The population was 3,282 at the 2020 census. The village is located within the boundaries of the Adirondack Park, west of Lake Placid. Along with nearby Saranac Lake, these three villages make up what is known as the Tri-Lakes region.

The village of Tupper Lake is in the town of Tupper Lake, called Altamont before 2004. The town and the village are in the southwestern part of the county. It is named for 11,000-acre Tupper Lake, two miles south of the village.

The Wild Center, a 54,000 square feet (5,000 m^{2}) natural history center, is on a 31 acres (130,000 m^{2}) campus. The Adirondack Sky Center & Observatory is on the north side of town.

== History ==
Settlement began circa 1844. The village was settled during the town's lumber production period and grew after it gained railroad service (see below). The early village was composed of two parts, Tupper Lake proper and Faust. The town, for a time, held the distinction as the top lumber producer in the state.

The great fire of 1899 burned more than 169 structures in the village, two-thirds of them homes. The modern village grew out of this destruction and added all the amenities of a modern community earlier than many other villages in the state. Tupper had its own department store and synagogue, and its sprawling railway yards, driven by the lumber trade, made it a hub for the surrounding Adirondack communities.

Railroad service from Herkimer, NY through Tupper Lake (to Malone, Montreal and Lake Placid) began in 1892 with the opening of the Mohawk and Malone Railway. (For the complete subsequent railroad history to 2021, see Wikipedia articles on this early railroad and on the Adirondack Railroad). After a total lapse of service from 1981 through 2021, the Adirondack Railroad resumed tourist passenger service between Utica and Tupper Lake (108 miles (174 km)), its new northern terminus, by special train in fall 2022. Regularly scheduled passenger service over the entire route began in late spring 2023.

== Geography ==
The village of Tupper Lake is located near the center of the town of Tupper Lake at 44°14′00″N 74°27′57″W, on the east shore of Raquette Pond, the northern end of the Tupper Lake water body. According to the United States Census Bureau, the village has a total area of 2.1 square miles (5.5 km^{2}), of which 2.1 square miles (5.4 km^{2}) is land and 0.04 square miles (0.1 km^{2}), or 2.06%, is water.

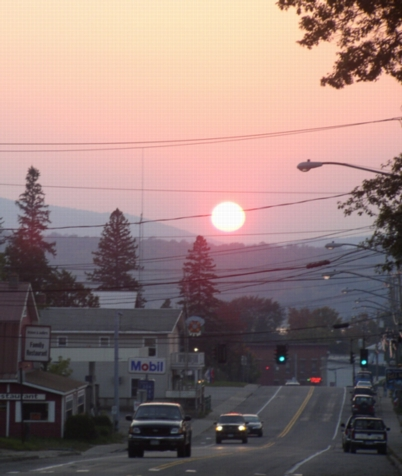
Tupper Lake village

New York State Route 3 and New York State Route 30 intersect at the village. NY 3 leads west 94 miles (151 km) to Watertown, and NY 30 leads south 120 miles (190 km) to Amsterdam on the Mohawk River. The two highways lead east out of Tupper Lake together, with NY 30 eventually turning north towards Malone, 58 miles (93 km) from Tupper Lake, and NY 3 continuing east 21 miles (34 km) to Saranac Lake.

The Raquette River flows past the south side of the village, entering Tupper Lake/Raquette Pond. The river continues northwest out of the Adirondacks through Potsdam, eventually joining the St. Lawrence River northeast of Massena.

== Demographics ==
Historical population
Census	Pop.	Note	%±
1910	3,067		—
1920	2,508		−18.2%
1930	5,271		110.2%
1940	5,451		3.4%
1950	5,441		−0.2%
1960	5,200		−4.4%
1970	4,854		−6.7%
1980	4,478		−7.7%
1990	4,087		−8.7%
2000	3,935		−3.7%
2010	3,667		−6.8%
2020	3,282		−10.5%
U.S. Decennial Census

As of the census of 2000, there were 3,935 people, 1,684 households, and 988 families residing in the village. The population density was 2,212.7 inhabitants per square mile (854.3/km^{2}). There were 1,839 housing units at an average density of 1,034.1 per square mile (399.3/km^{2}). The racial makeup of the village was 97.89% White, 0.76% African American, 0.30% Native American, 0.05% Asian, 0.10% from other races, and 0.89% from two or more races. Hispanic or Latino of any race were 0.51% of the population.

There were 1,684 households, out of which 31.2% had children under the age of 18 living with them, 40.1% were married couples living together, 13.8% had a female householder with no husband present, and 41.3% were non-families. 34.0% of all households were made up of individuals, and 17.9% had someone living alone who was 65 years of age or older. The average household size was 2.31 and the average family size was 2.97.

In the village, the population was spread out, with 26.5% under the age of 18, 7.7% from 18 to 24, 28.9% from 25 to 44, 19.8% from 45 to 64, and 17.1% who were 65 years of age or older. The median age was 36 years. For every 100 females, there were 95.0 males. For every 100 females age 18 and over, there were 88.1 males.

The median income for a household in the village was $31,654, and the median income for a family was $40,152. Males had a median income of $30,169 versus $24,273 for females. The per capita income for the village was $15,567. About 7.7% of families and 11.7% of the population were below the poverty line, including 14.0% of those under age 18 and 12.7% of those age 65 or over.

Tupper Lake High School is the home of the Lumberjacks and Ladyjacks. Their mascot is a bearded Lumberjack wearing a red and black flannel shirt and black pants with suspenders holding an axe. The school colors are red and black.

== Climate ==
According to the Köppen climate classification system, Tupper Lake has a warm summer, Humid continental climate (Dfb). Dfb climates are characterized by a least one month having an average mean temperature ≤ 32.0 °F (0.0 °C), at least four months with an average mean temperature ≥ 50.0 °F (10.0 °C), all months with an average mean temperature < 71.6 °F (22.0 °C) and no significant precipitation difference between seasons. Although most summer days are comfortably humid in Tupper Lake, episodes of heat and high humidity can occur with heat index values > 89 °F (32 °C). Since 1981, the highest air temperature was 92.7 °F (33.7 °C) on August 3, 1988, and the highest daily average mean dew point was 70.9 °F (21.6 °C) on August 1, 2006. Since 1981, the wettest calendar day was 3.44 inches (87 mm) on November 8, 1996. During the winter months, the average annual extreme minimum air temperature is −27.4 °F (−33.0 °C). Since 1981, the coldest air temperature was −34.6 °F (−37.0 °C) on January 4, 1981. Episodes of extreme cold and wind can occur, with wind chill values falling below −43 °F (−42 °C). The average annual snowfall total between September and May is between 100 inches (254 cm) and 125 inches (318 cm).

Climate data for Tupper Lake Sunmount, New York, 1991–2020 normals, extremes 1899-2020: 1680ft (512m)
Month	Jan	Feb	Mar	Apr	May	Jun	Jul	Aug	Sep	Oct	Nov	Dec	Year
Record high °F (°C)	63 (17)	67 (19)	83 (28)	86 (30)	92 (33)	97 (36)	98 (37)	98 (37)	95 (35)	85 (29)	78 (26)	65 (18)	98 (37)
Mean maximum °F (°C)	47 (8)	49 (9)	58 (14)	72 (22)	82 (28)	87 (31)	87 (31)	86 (30)	84 (29)	74 (23)	62 (17)	49 (9)	89 (32)
Mean daily maximum °F (°C)	25.3 (−3.7)	28.6 (−1.9)	36.5 (2.5)	50.2 (10.1)	64.6 (18.1)	72.9 (22.7)	77.4 (25.2)	75.9 (24.4)	69.1 (20.6)	55.1 (12.8)	42.1 (5.6)	31.1 (−0.5)	52.4 (11.3)
Daily mean °F (°C)	14.7 (−9.6)	16.8 (−8.4)	25.3 (−3.7)	39.3 (4.1)	52.6 (11.4)	61.3 (16.3)	65.9 (18.8)	64.4 (18.0)	57.1 (13.9)	45.1 (7.3)	33.4 (0.8)	22.2 (−5.4)	41.5 (5.3)
Mean daily minimum °F (°C)	4.1 (−15.5)	5.1 (−14.9)	14.1 (−9.9)	28.3 (−2.1)	40.6 (4.8)	49.7 (9.8)	54.4 (12.4)	52.9 (11.6)	45.1 (7.3)	35.2 (1.8)	24.8 (−4.0)	13.2 (−10.4)	30.6 (−0.8)
Mean minimum °F (°C)	−22 (−30)	−18 (−28)	−10 (−23)	12 (−11)	25 (−4)	34 (1)	41 (5)	39 (4)	30 (−1)	20 (−7)	6 (−14)	−14 (−26)	−26 (−32)
Record low °F (°C)	−38 (−39)	−40 (−40)	−33 (−36)	−8 (−22)	9 (−13)	23 (−5)	30 (−1)	30 (−1)	19 (−7)	8 (−13)	−16 (−27)	−38 (−39)	−40 (−40)
Average precipitation inches (mm)	3.25 (83)	2.65 (67)	3.11 (79)	3.79 (96)	3.77 (96)	4.55 (116)	4.32 (110)	4.16 (106)	3.86 (98)	4.41 (112)	3.66 (93)	3.52 (89)	45.05 (1,145)
Average snowfall inches (cm)	23.3 (59)	24.0 (61)	17.7 (45)	4.1 (10)	0.1 (0.25)	0.0 (0.0)	0.0 (0.0)	0.0 (0.0)	trace	1.3 (3.3)	7.4 (19)	21.3 (54)	99.2 (251.55)
Source 1: NOAA
Source 2: XMACIS (snowfall, temp records & monthly max/mins)

== Ecology ==
According to the A. W. Kuchler U.S. potential natural vegetation types, Tupper Lake would have a dominant vegetation type of Northern Hardwoods/Spruce, (108) with a dominant vegetation form of Northern Hardwoods (23). The plant hardiness zone is 4a, with an average annual extreme minimum air temperature of −27.4 °F (−33.0 °C). The spring bloom typically peaks on approximately May 11 and fall color usually peaks around October 2.

== Transportation ==
=== Rail ===
Into the mid-20th century the New York Central railroad operated passenger trains from the south, through Tupper Lake, and to Lake Placid, Malone and Montreal. In spring 2023 the Adirondack Railroad again began operating passenger trains from Utica, New York to Tupper Lake as its northern terminus.

=== Roads ===
New York Route 3 and New York Route 30 serve the village.

== Education ==
The school district is Tupper Lake Central School District.
