= Tupper Lake (New York) =

Lake in New York, United States

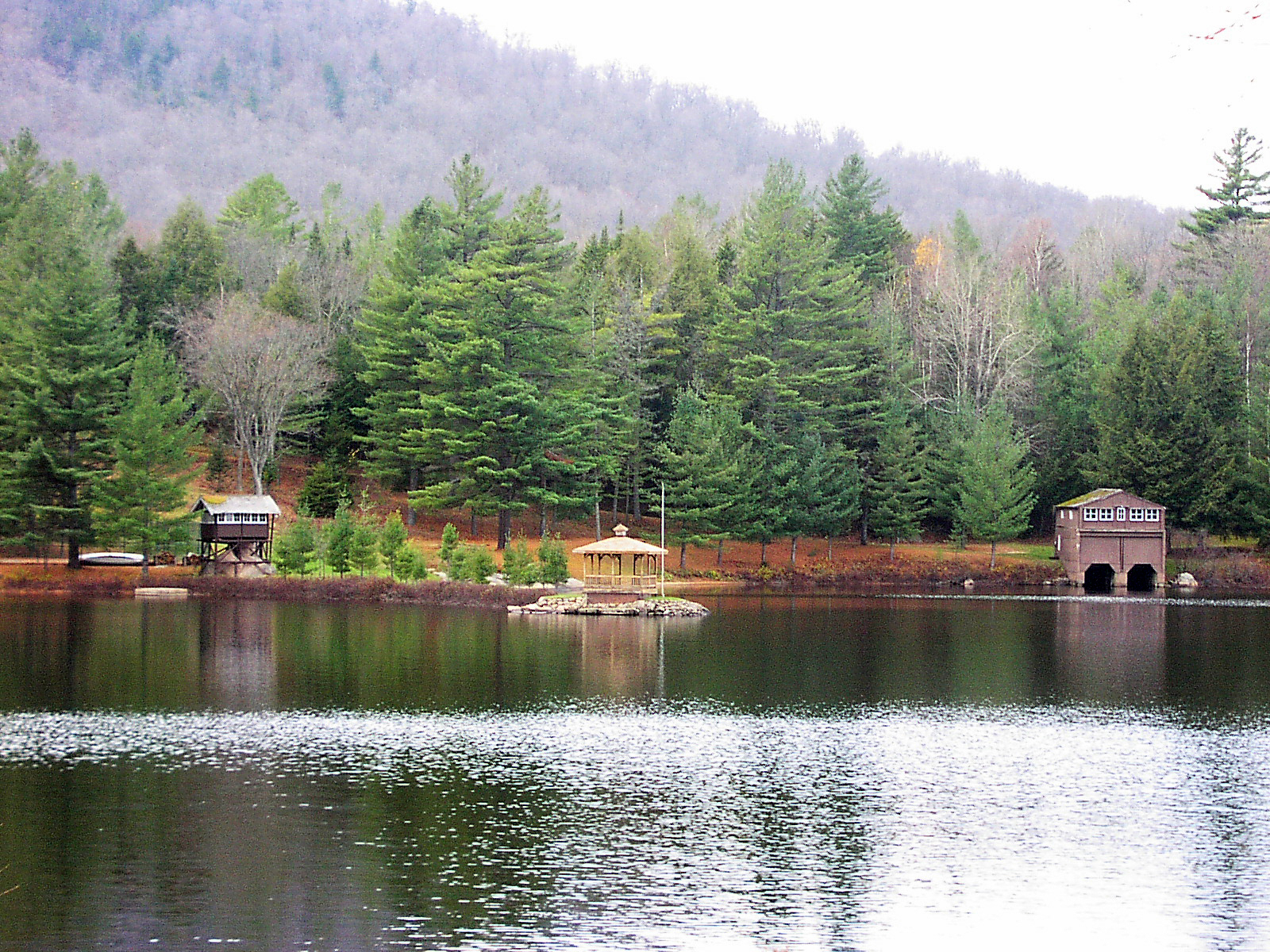
- Boathouses on the lake

- Location within New York Location within the United States
- Location: Adirondack Park, Altamont / Piercefield, New York, US
- Coordinates: 44.17°N 74.54°W
- Primary inflows: Raquette River, Bog River
- Primary outflows: Raquette River
- Basin countries: United States
- Surface area: 5,230 acres (21.2 km^{2})
- Surface elevation: 1,545 ft (471 m)
- Islands: County Line Island, Bluff Island, Birch Island-for sale
- Settlements: Village of Tupper Lake

Tupper Lake (a.k.a. Big Tupper Lake) is located in the state of New York in the United States. The lake is in the Adirondack Park and crosses the county lines of St. Lawrence County and Franklin County.

Tupper Lake was discovered by Native Americans indigenous to the area around the 16th century. The lake was named after a land surveyor named Ansel Tupper who was the first European to have seen the lake. It is aligned in a northeast to southwest direction along its length. The lake is fed and drained by the Raquette River.

The lake is located in the towns of Tupper Lake, New York (Franklin County) and Piercefield (St. Lawrence County). The Village of Tupper Lake is at the northeast end of the lake in the Town of Tupper Lake. The village is adjacent to Raquette Pond, an arm of the lake at its northwest end. Another arm of the lake, Lake Simond (also known as Simond Pond and Simon Pond), is south of the village. Some of the islands in the lake include County Line Island and Bluff Island.

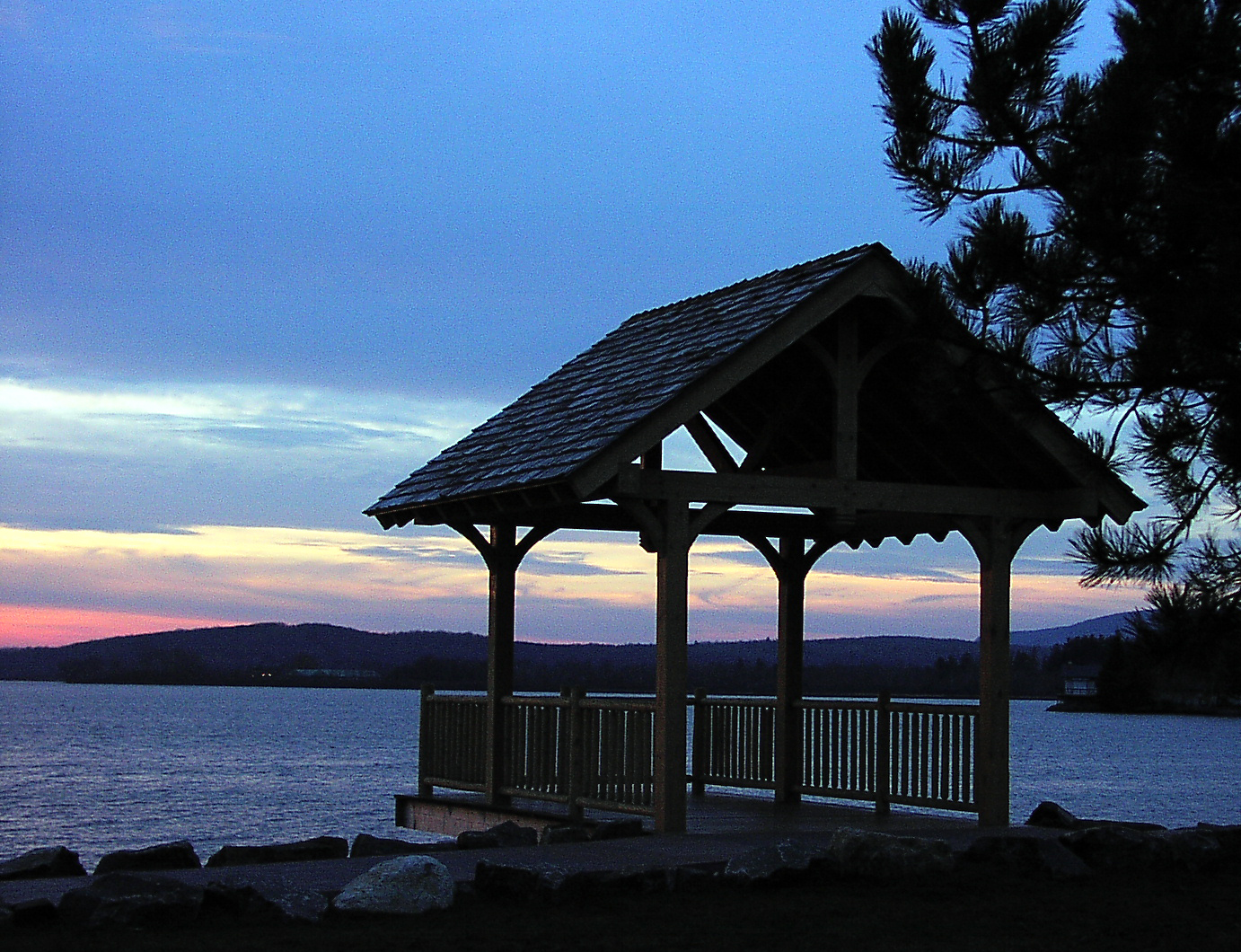
Racquette Pond

== Local fish fauna ==
Tupper Lake has a variety of fish within its local fauna. Common species that can be found within the lake consist of the Brown Bullhead, Landlocked Atlantic Salmon, Lake Trout, Lake Whitefish, Northern Pike, Pumpkinseed, Rainbow Smelt, Redbreast Sunfish, Smallmouth Bass, Walleye, and the Yellow Perch. Rare species that can be found consist of the Cisco, and the Tiger Muskellunge.
