= List of mountains by elevation =

This is an incomplete list of notable mountains on Earth, sorted by elevation in metres above sea level. For a complete list of mountains over 7200 m high, with at least 500 m of prominence, see List of highest mountains. See also a list of mountains ranked by prominence.

== 8,000 metres ==
There are 14 mountains over 8,000 metres (26,247 ft), which are often referred to as the eight-thousanders. (There are six more 8,000m peaks in Nepal, waiting for official recognition, making for a total of 20.) All are in the two highest mountain ranges in the world, the Himalayas and the Karakoram.

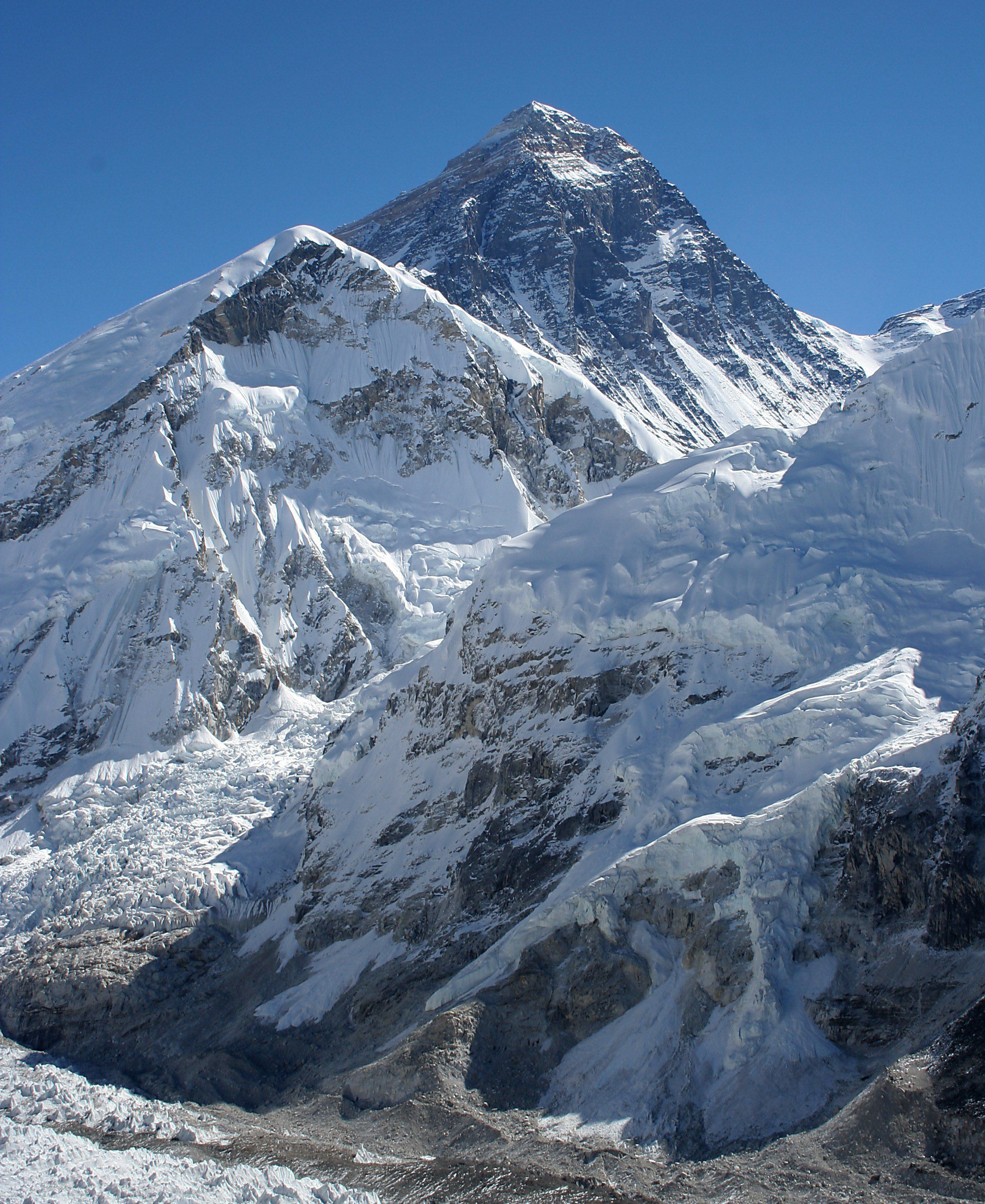
Mount Everest - 8,848 m (29,029 ft)

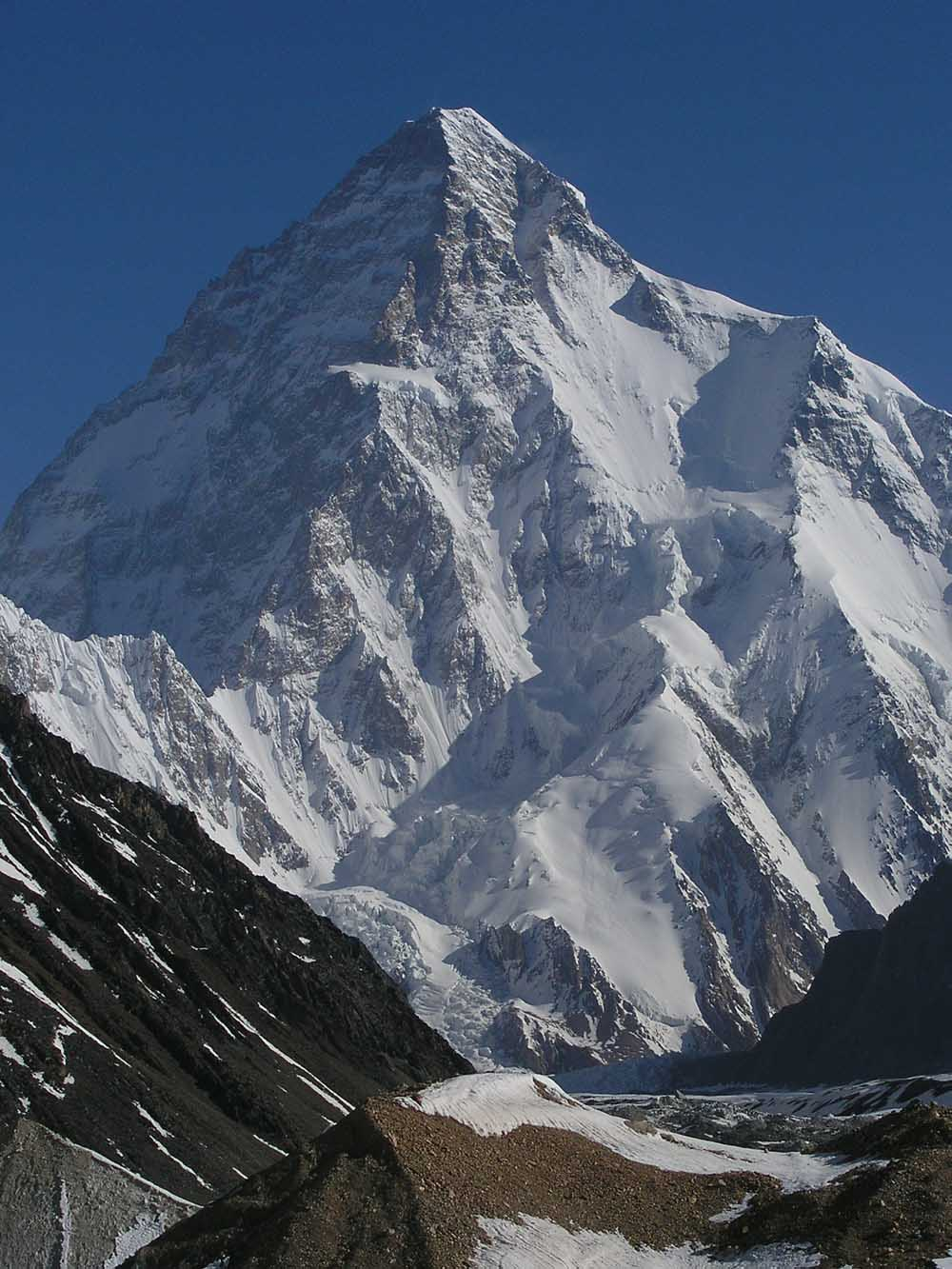
K2 - 8,611 m (28,251 ft)

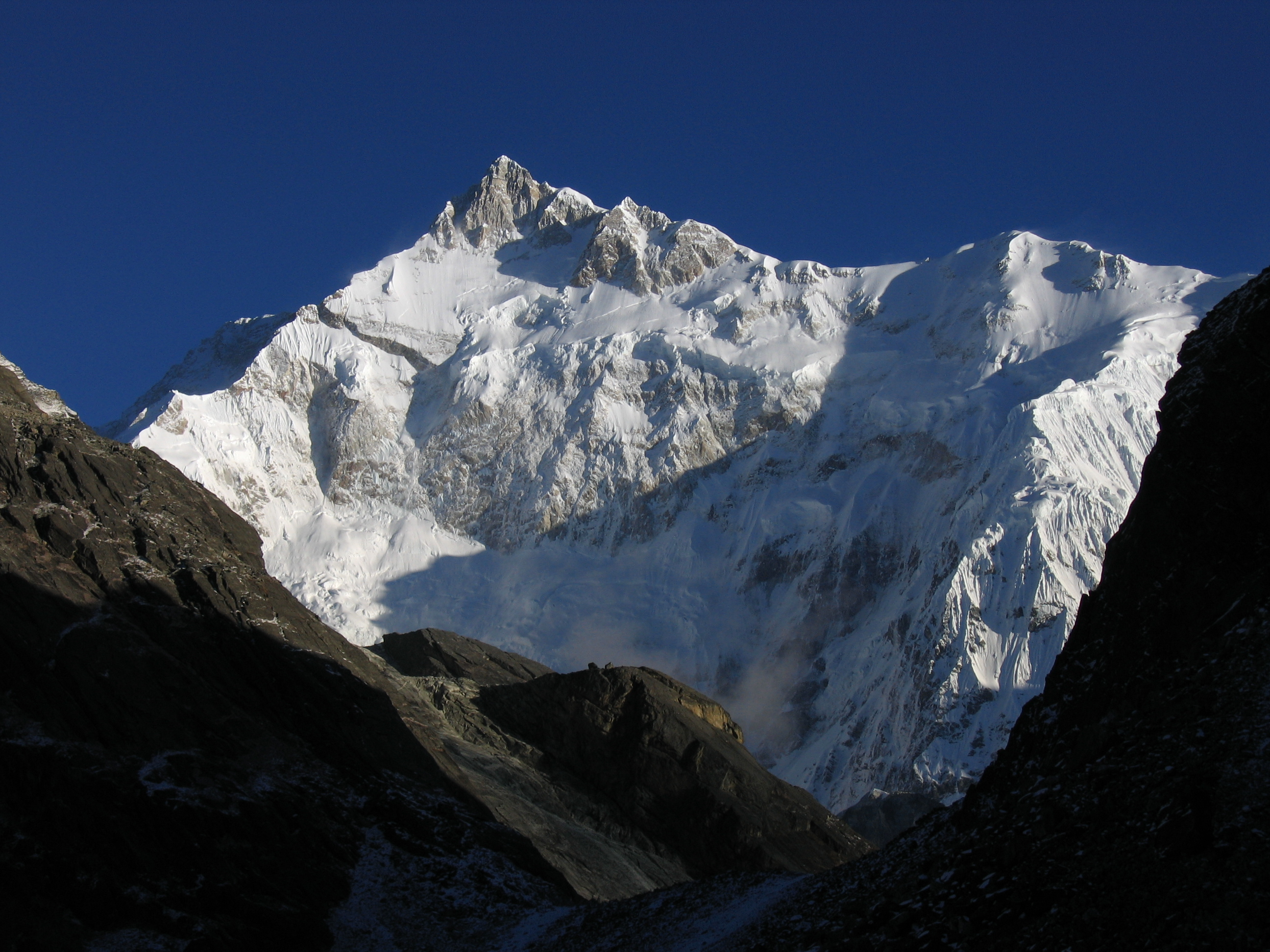
Kanchenjunga - 8,586 m (28,169 ft)

Mountain	Metres	Feet	Range	Location and notes
Mount Everest	8,848	29,029	Himalayas	China/Nepal
K2	8,611	28,251	Karakoram	China/Pakistan
Kangchenjunga	8,586	28,169	Himalayas	India/Nepal
Lhotse	8,516	27,940	Himalayas	Nepal – Climbers ascend Lhotse Face in climbing Everest
Makalu	8,485	27,838	Himalayas	Nepal
Cho Oyu	8,188	26,864	Himalayas	Nepal – Considered "easiest" eight-thousander
Dhaulagiri	8,167	26,795	Himalayas	Nepal – Presumed world's highest from 1808-1838
Manaslu	8,163	26,781	Himalayas	Nepal
Nanga Parbat	8,126	26,660	Himalayas	Pakistan
Annapurna	8,091	26,545	Himalayas	Nepal – First eight-thousander to be climbed (1950)
Gasherbrum I (Hidden peak; K5)	8,080	26,510	Karakoram	Pakistan – Originally named K5
Broad Peak	8,051	26,414	Karakoram	Pakistan
Gasherbrum II (K4)	8,035	26,362	Karakoram	Pakistan – Originally named K4
Shishapangma	8,027	26,335	Himalayas	China

== 7,000 metres ==
There are 132 mountains between 7,000 and 8,000 metres (22,966 ft and 26,247 ft)

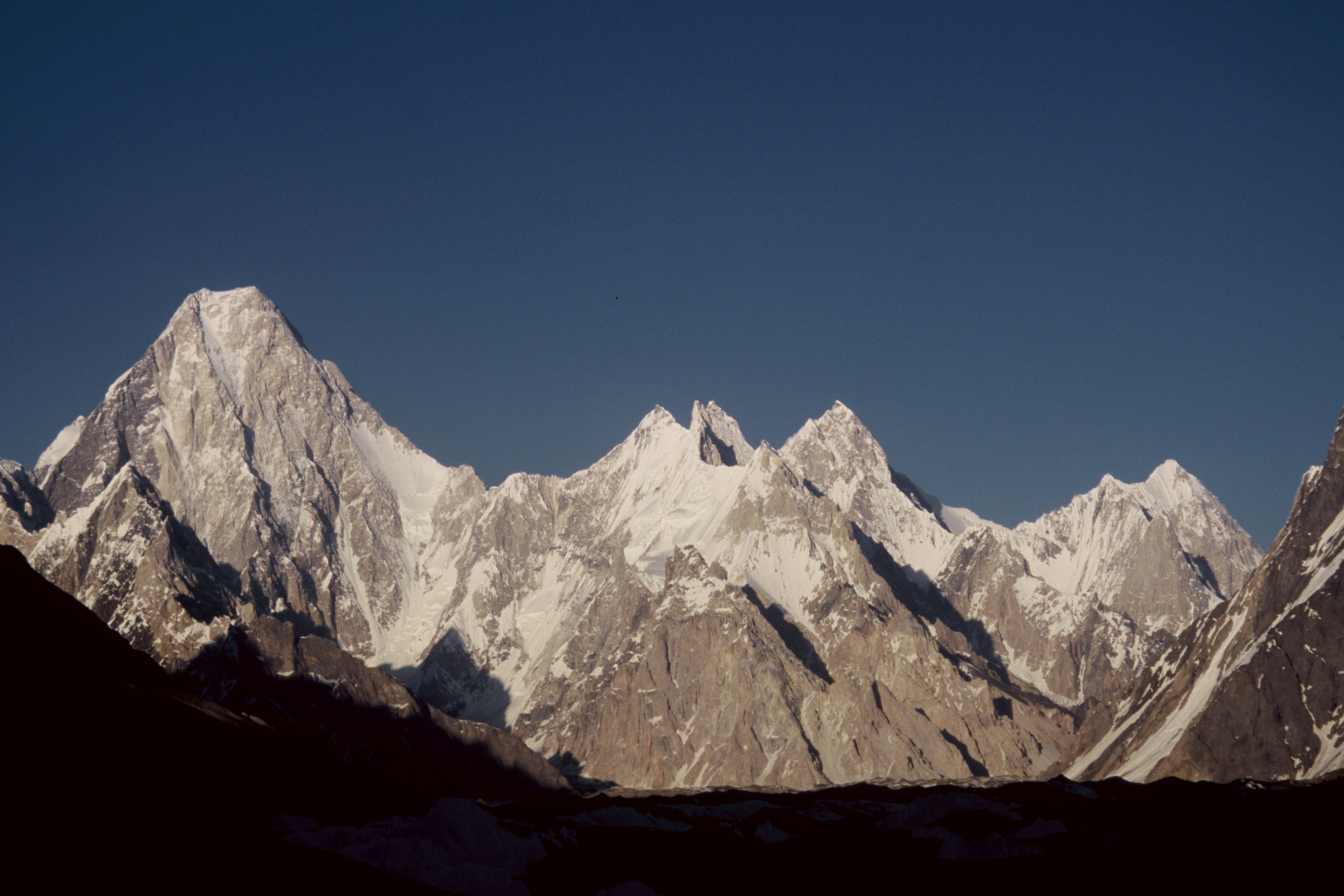
Left to right: Gasherbrum IV, VII, V, VI

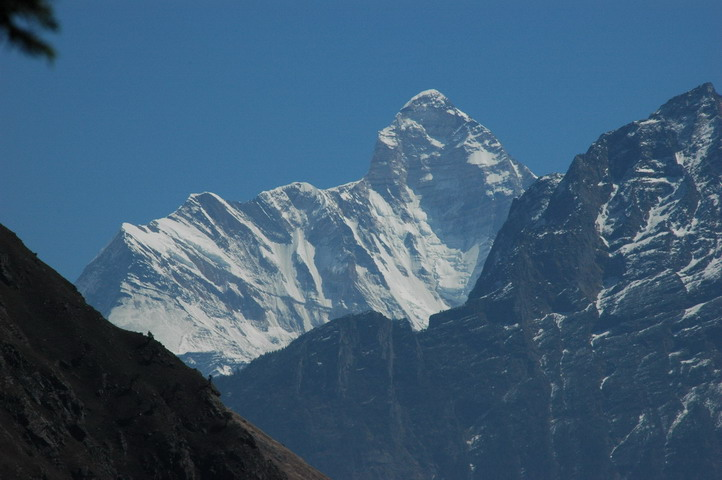
Nanda Devi - 7,816 m (25,643 ft)

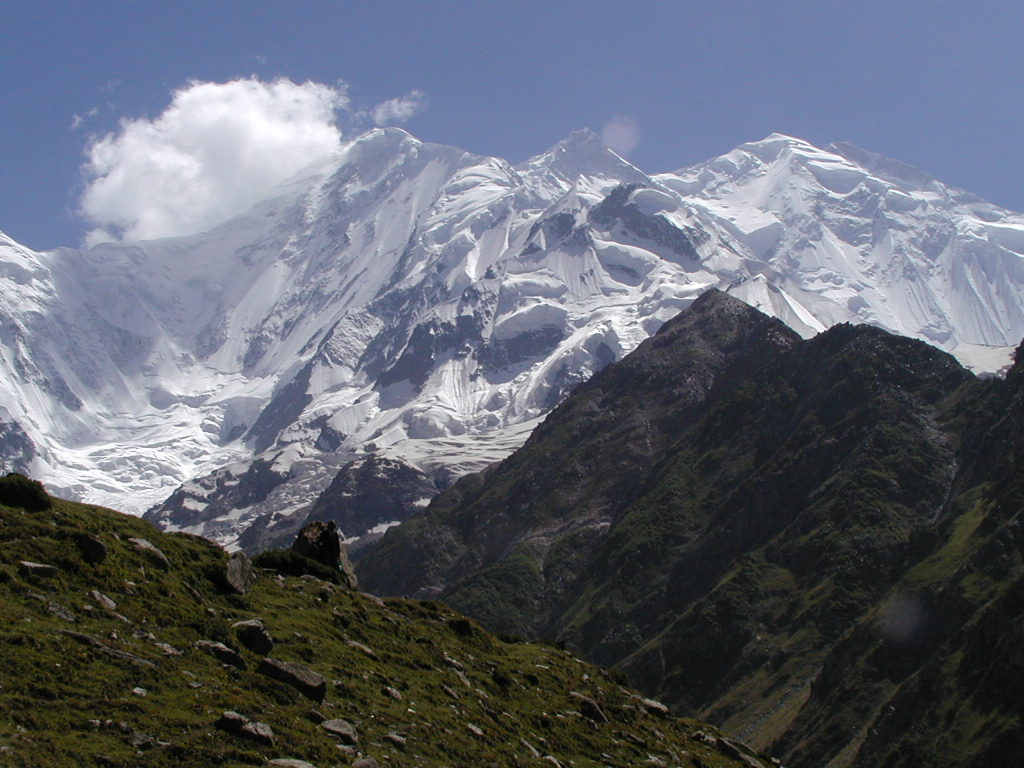
Rakaposhi - 7,788 m (25,551 ft)

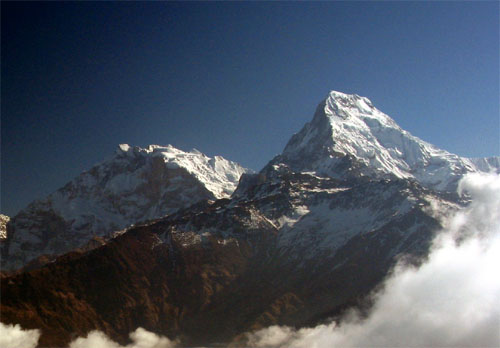
Annapurna I (left) and South

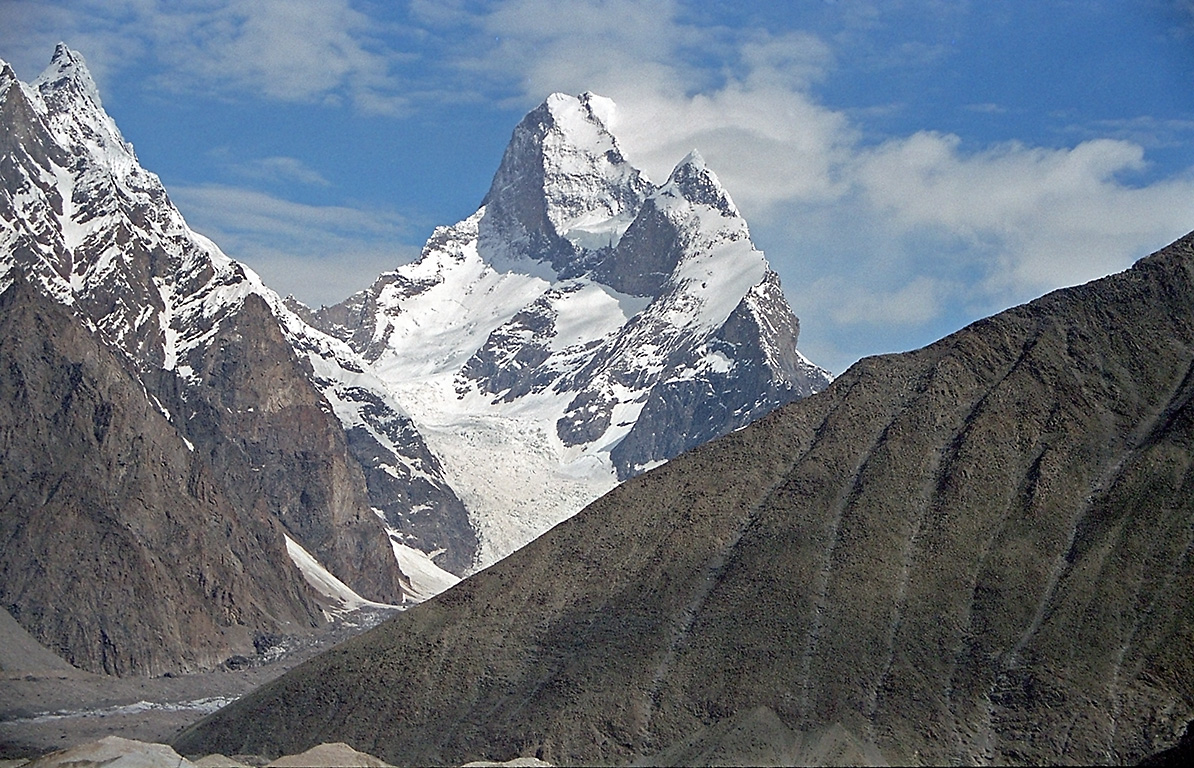
Muztagh Tower - 7,273 m (23,862 ft)

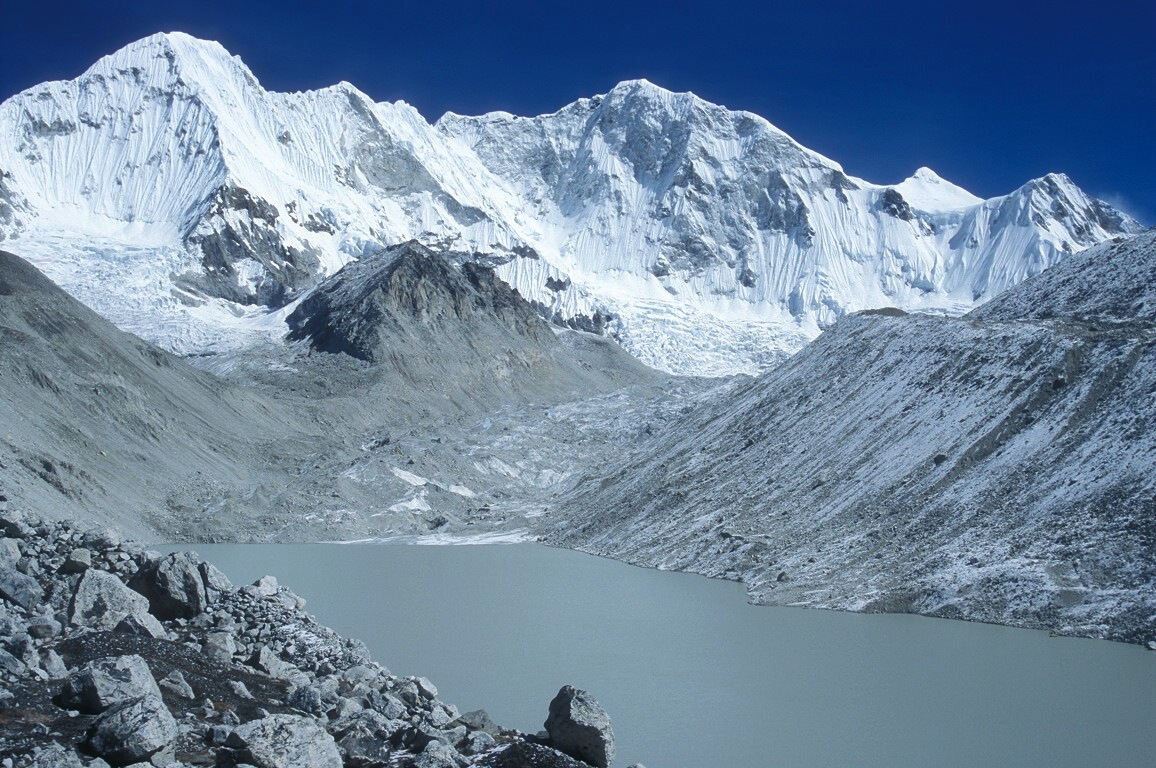
Baruntse - 7,220 m (23,688 ft)

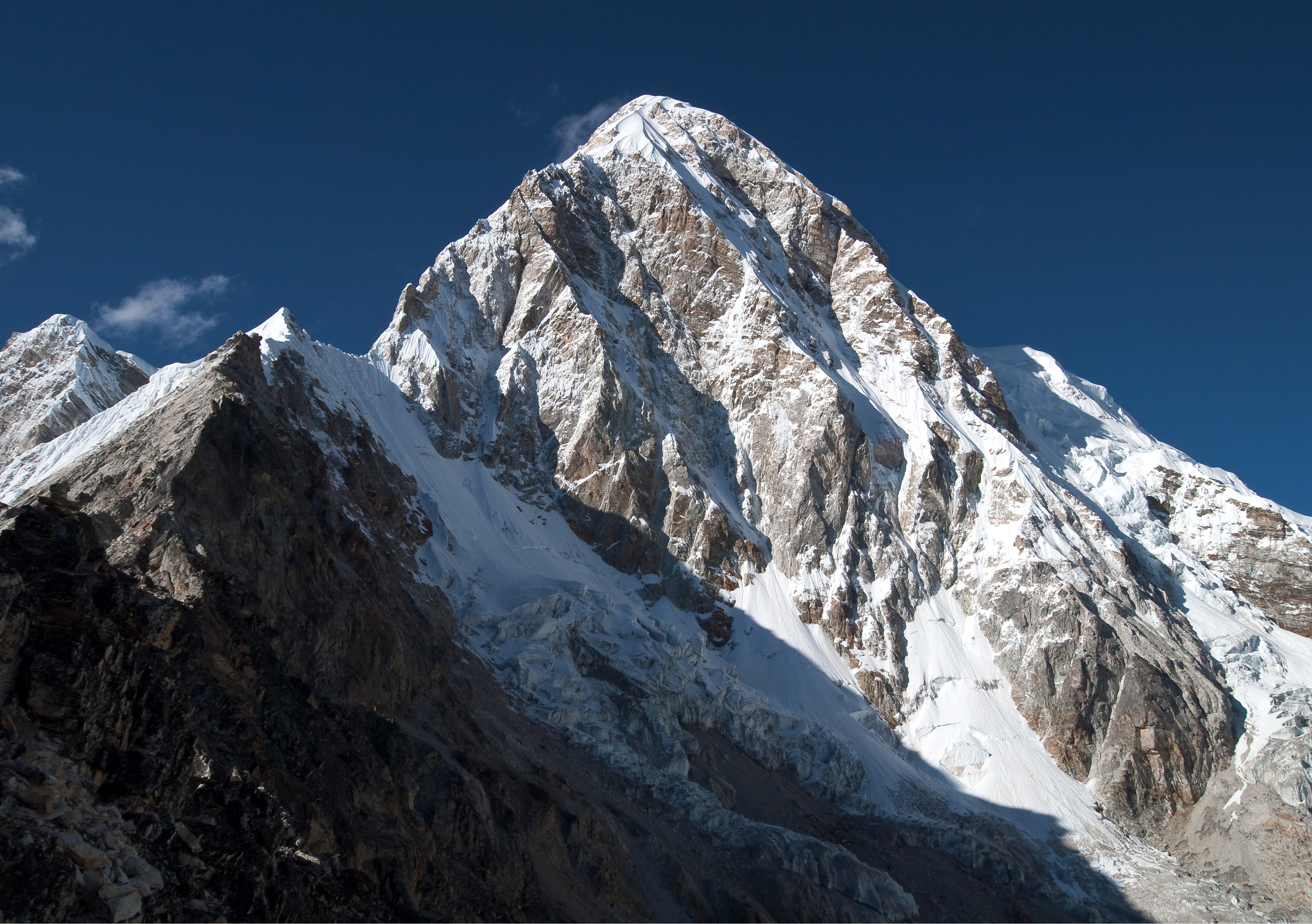
Pumori - 7,161 m (23,494 ft)

Mountain	Metres	Feet	Range	Location and notes
Gasherbrum III	7,952	26,089	Karakoram	Pakistan
Gyachung Kang	7,952	26,089	Himalayas	Nepal (Khumbu)/China
Annapurna II	7,937	26,040	Himalayas	Nepal
Gasherbrum IV (K3)	7,932	26,024	Karakoram	Pakistan
Himalchuli	7,893	25,896	Himalayas	Manaslu, Nepal
Distaghil Sar	7,885	25,869	Karakoram	Pakistan
Ngadi Chuli	7,871	25,823	Himalayas	Manaslu, Nepal
Nuptse	7,861	25,791	Himalayas	Everest Massif, Nepal
Khunyang Chhish	7,852	25,761	Karakoram	Pakistan
Masherbrum (K1)	7,821	25,659	Karakoram	Pakistan – Originally named K1
Nanda Devi	7,816	25,643	Himalayas	India (Uttarakhand)
Chomo Lonzo	7,804	25,604	Himalayas	Makalu Massiff, Nepal/China
Batura Sar	7,795	25,574	Karakoram	Pakistan
Rakaposhi	7,788	25,551	Karakoram	Pakistan
Namcha Barwa	7,782	25,531	Himalayas	China
Batura II	7,762	25,466	Karakoram	Pakistan
Kanjut Sar	7,760	25,460	Karakoram	Pakistan
Kamet	7,756	25,446	Himalayas	India (Uttarakhand)
Dhaulagiri II	7,751	25,430	Himalayas	Nepal
Saltoro Kangri	7,742	25,400	Karakoram	India (Ladakh)
Batura III	7,729	25,358	Karakoram	Pakistan
Jannu	7,710	25,300	Himalayas	Kangchenjunga, Nepal
Tirich Mir	7,708	25,289	Hindu Kush	Pakistan – #1 in Hindu Kush
Molamenqing	7,703	25,272	Himalayas	Shishapangma group, China
Gurla Mandhata	7,694	25,243	Himalayas (Nalakankar)	China
Saser Kangri	7,672	25,171	Karakoram	India (Ladakh)
Chogolisa	7,665	25,148	Karakoram	Pakistan
Kongur Tagh	7,649	25,095	Pamir or Kunlun Mountains	China
Shispare	7,611	24,970	Karakoram	Pakistan
Silberzacken	7,597	24,925	Himalaya	Pakistan
Trivor	7,577	24,859	Karakoram	Karakoram – Pakistan
Gangkhar Puensum	7,570	24,840	Himalayas	Bhutan/China
Gongga Shan	7,556	24,790	Daxue Shan	Sichuan, China
Annapurna III	7,555	24,787	Himalayas	Nepal
Muztagh Ata	7,546	24,757	Pamir or Kunlun Mountains	China (Xinjiang)
Skyang Kangri	7,545	24,754	Karakoram	Pakistan
Changtse	7,543	24,747	Himalayas	Everest Massif, China
Kula Kangri	7,538	24,731	Himalayas	China (possibly also Bhutan)
Liankang Kangri	7,535	24,721	Himalayas	Bhutan/China
Yukshin Gardan Sar	7,530	24,700	Karakoram	Pakistan
Annapurna IV	7,525	24,688	Himalayas	Nepal
Saser Kangri II	7,518	24,665	Karakoram	India (Ladakh)
Mamostong Kangri	7,516	24,659	Karakoram	India (Ladakh)
Ismoil Somoni Peak	7,495	24,590	Pamir Mountains	Tajikistan
Saser Kangri III	7,495	24,590	Karakoram	India (Ladakh)
Noshaq	7,492	24,580	Hindu Kush	Pakistan/Afghanistan – #1 in Afghanistan
Pumari Chhish	7,492	24,580	Karakoram	Pakistan
Passu Sar	7,476	24,528	Karakoram	Pakistan
Jongsong Peak	7,462	24,482	Himalayas	India/Nepal/China
Malubiting	7,458	24,469	Karakoram	Pakistan
Gangapurna	7,455	24,459	Annapurna Himalaya	Nepal
Muchu Chhish (Batura V)	7,453	24,452	Karakoram	Pakistan
Jengish Chokusu	7,439	24,406	Tian Shan	China/Kyrgyzstan – #1 in Tian Shan
K12	7,428	24,370	Karakoram	India/Pakistan
Sia Kangri	7,422	24,350	Karakoram	Pakistan
Momhil Sar	7,414	24,324	Karakoram	Pakistan
Istor-o-Nal	7,403	24,288	Hindu Kush	Pakistan
Ghent Kangri	7,401	24,281	Karakoram	India (Ladakh)/Pakistan
Haramosh Peak	7,397	24,268	Karakoram	Pakistan
Kabru	7,394	24,259	Himalayas	Kanchenjunga, India (Sikkim)/Nepal
Ultar	7,388	24,239	Karakoram	Pakistan
Rimo I	7,385	24,229	Karakoram	India (Ladakh)
Sherpi Kangri	7,380	24,210	Karakoram	Pakistan
Churen Himal	7,371	24,183	Himalayas	Nepal
Labuche Kang	7,367	24,170	Himalayas	near Cho Oyu, Nepal/China
Kirat Chuli	7,365	24,163	Himalayas	Nepal/India (Sikkim) border
Skil Brum	7,360	24,150	Karakoram	Pakistan – May also be given as 7,410 m
Abi Gamin	7,355	24,131	Himalayas	India
Gimmigela Chuli	7,350	24,110	Himalayas	Nepal/India (Sikkim) border
Saraghrar	7,340	24,080	Hindu Kush	Pakistan
Bojohagur Duanasir	7,329	24,045	Karakoram	Pakistan
Chamlang	7,319	24,012	Himalayas	Khumbu, Nepal
Chongtar Kangri	7,315	23,999	Karakoram	Pakistan
Jomolhari / Chomolhari	7,314	23,996	Himalayas	Bhutan/China
Baltoro Kangri	7,312	23,990	Karakoram	Pakistan
Siguang Ri	7,308	23,976	Himalayas	China
Summa Ri	7,302	23,957	Himalayas	Pakistan
The Crown	7,295	23,934	Karakoram	China (Xinjiang)
Gyala Peri	7,294	23,930	Himalayas	China
Porong Ri	7,292	23,924	Himalayas	China
Baintha Brakk	7,285	23,901	Karakoram	Pakistan
Yutmaru Sar	7,283	23,894	Karakoram	Pakistan
K6	7,282	23,891	Karakoram	Pakistan – Also known as Baltistan Peak
Kangpenqing	7,281	23,888	Himalayas	China
Mana Peak	7,272	23,858	Himalayas	India (Uttarakhand) – SSE of Kamet
Muztagh Tower	7,273	23,862	Karakoram	Pakistan
Diran	7,257	23,809	Karakoram	Pakistan
Apsarasas Kangri	7,245	23,770	Karakoram	China/Pakistan
Langtang Lirung	7,227	23,711	Himalayas	Nepal
Karjiang	7,221	23,691	Himalayas	China
Annapurna South	7,219	23,684	Himalayas	Nepal
Khartaphu	7,213	23,665	Himalayas	China
Tongshanjiabu	7,207	23,645	Himalayas	Bhutan/China
Langtang Ri	7,205	23,638	Himalayas	Nepal/China
Kangphu Kang	7,204	23,635	Himalayas	Bhutan/China
Singhi Kangri	7,202	23,629	Himalayas	India/China
Lupghar Sar	7,200	23,600	Karakoram	Pakistan
Gurja Himal	7,193	23,599	Himalayas	Nepal
Melungtse	7,181	23,560	Rolwaling Himalayas	China
Liushi Shan	7,167	23,514	Kunlun	China – #1 in Kunlun
Baruntse	7,162	23,497	Himalayas	Khumbu, Nepal
Pumori	7,161	23,494	Himalayas	Khumbu, Nepal
Hardeol	7,151	23,461	Himalayas	India (Uttarakhand)
Gasherbrum V	7,147	23,448	Karakoram	Pakistan
Latok I	7,145	23,442	Karakoram	Pakistan
Nemjung	7,140	23,430	Himalayas	Nepal
Udren Zom	7,140	23,430	Hindu Kush	Pakistan
Chaukhamba	7,138	23,419	Himalayas	India (Uttarakhand)
Nun Kun	7,135	23,409	Karakoram	India (Jammu and Kashmir, Ladakh)
Tilicho Peak	7,134	23,406	Himalayas	Annapurna Himal, Nepal
Gauri Sankar	7,134	23,406	Rolwaling Himalayas	Nepal/China
Lenin Peak	7,134	23,406	Pamir Mountains	Tajikistan-Kyrgyzstan – #2 in Pamirs
Bularung Sar	7,134	23,406	Karakoram	Pakistan
Api	7,132	23,399	Himalayas	Nepal
Teri Kang	7,124	23,373	Himalayas	Bhutan
Pauhunri	7,128	23,386	Himalayas	India (Sikkim)/China
Trisul	7,120	23,360	Himalayas	India (Uttarakhand)
Korzhenevskaya	7,105	23,310	Pamir Mountains	Tajikistan – #3 in Pamirs
Lunpo Gangri	7,095	23,278	Himalayas (Gangdise)	China
Satopanth	7,075	23,212	Himalayas	India (Uttarakhand)
Tirsuli	7,074	23,209	Himalayas	India (Uttarakhand)
Dunagiri	7,066	23,182	Himalayas	India (Uttarakhand)
Kangto	7,060	23,160	Himalayas	India (Arunachal Pradesh)/China
Nyegyi Kansang	7,047	23,120	Himalayas	India (Arunachal Pradesh)/China
Chomolhari Kang	7,046	23,117	Himalayas	Bhutan
Salasungo	7,043	23,107	Himalayas	Nepal/China
Link Sar	7,041	23,100	Karakoram	Pakistan
Kezhen Peak	7,038	23,091	Karakoram	China (Xinjiang)
Shah Dhar	7,038	23,091	Hindu Kush	Pakistan/Afghanistan
Saipal	7,031	23,068	Himalayas	Nepal
Padmanabh	7,030	23,060	Himalayas	India
Spantik	7,027	23,054	Karakoram	Pakistan
Pamri Sar	7,016	23,018	Karakoram	Pakistan
Khan Tengri	7,010	23,000	Tian Shan	Kyrgyzstan-Kazakhstan-China – #2 in Tian Shan

== 6,000 metres ==
Mountains between 6,000 and 7,000 metres (19,685 ft and 22,966 ft)

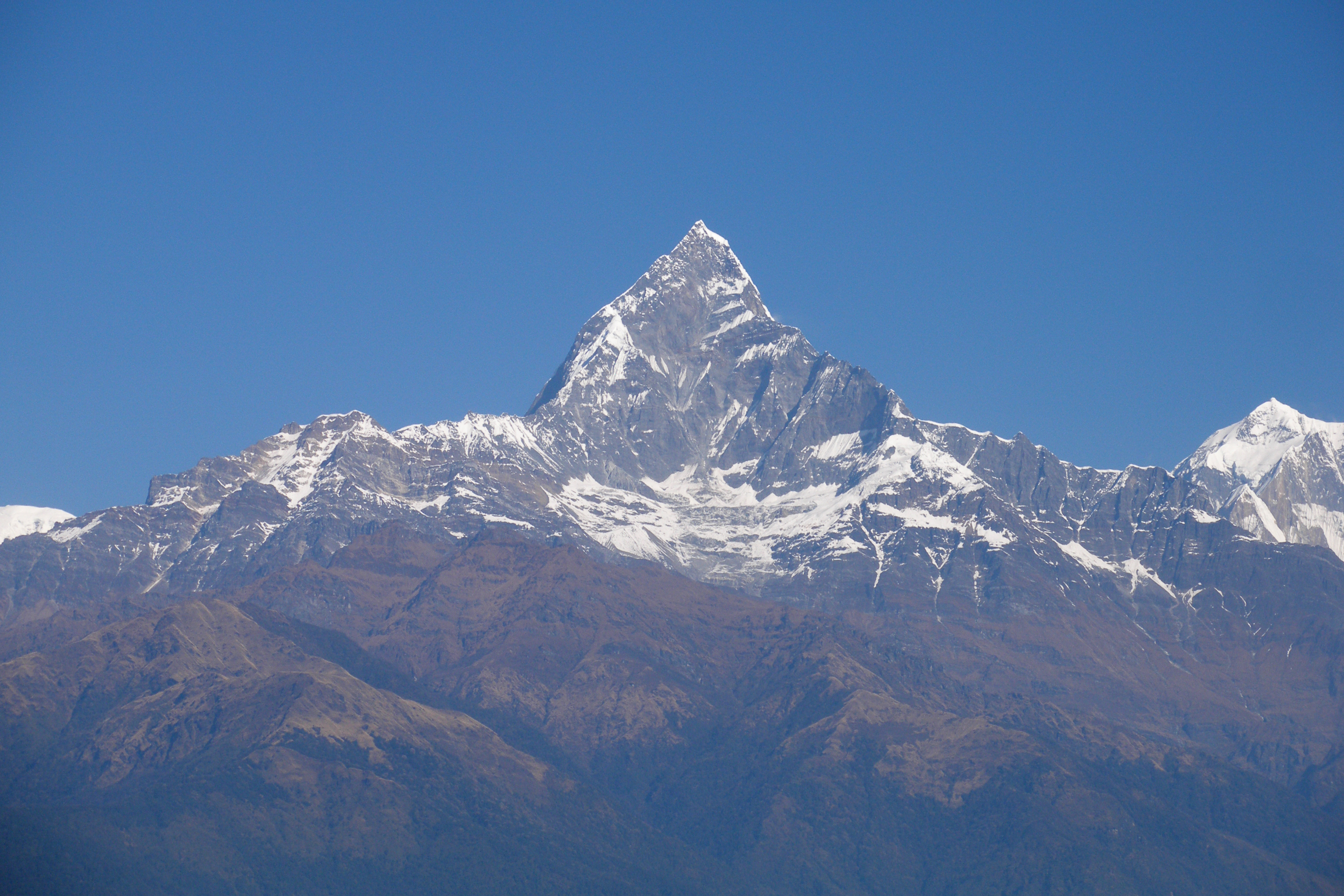
Machapuchare - 6,993 m (22,943 ft)

Lamjung Himal (Lamjung Kailash) Gandaki province Lamjung Nepal 6983 m

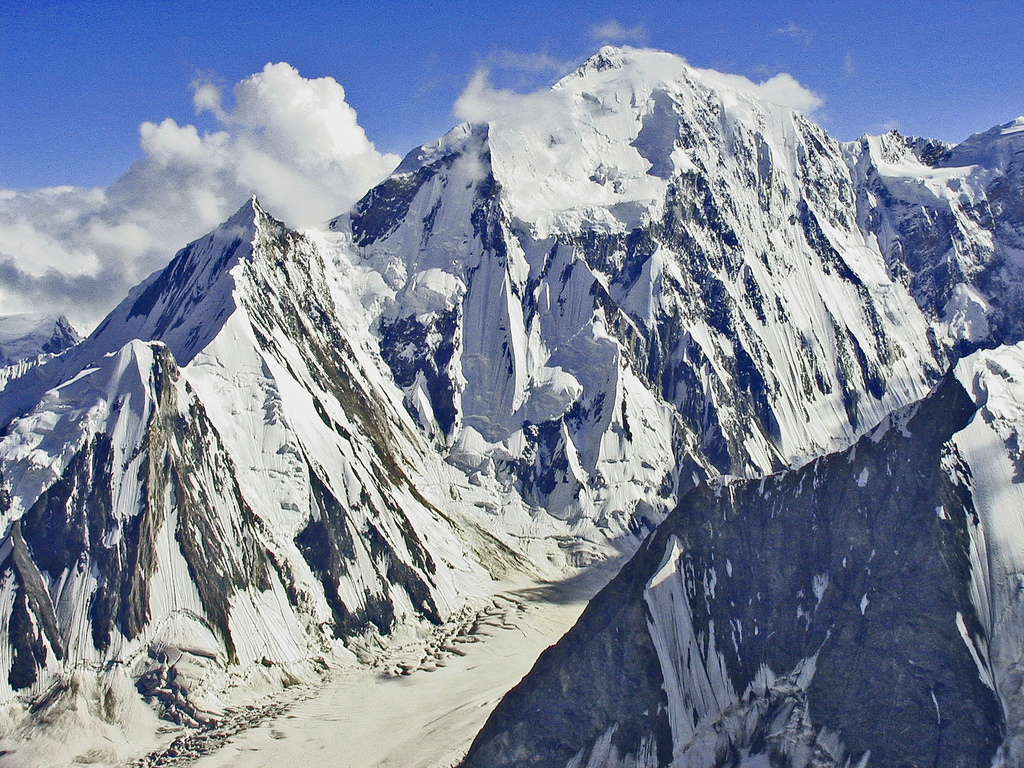
Laila Peak - 6,993 m (22,943 ft)

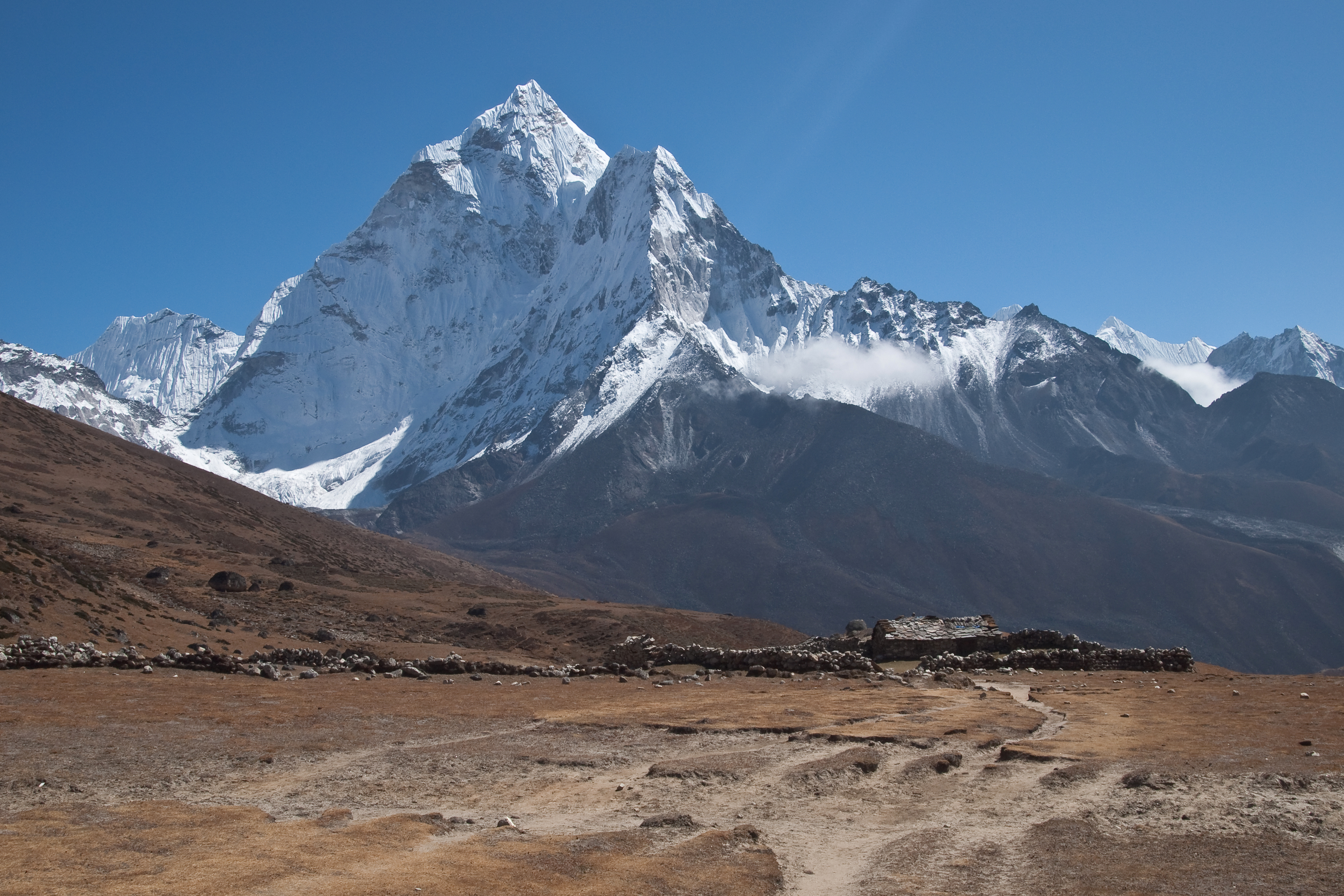
Ama Dablam - 6,812 m (22,349 ft)

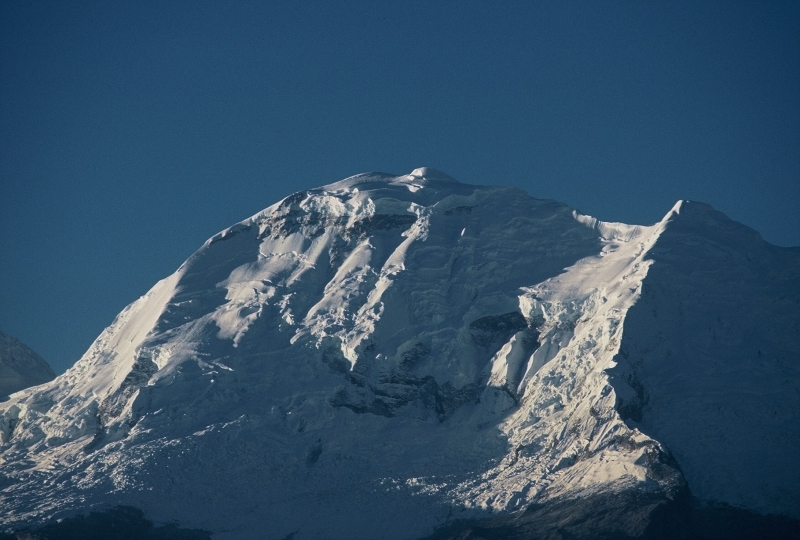
Huascarán - 6,768 m (22,205 ft)

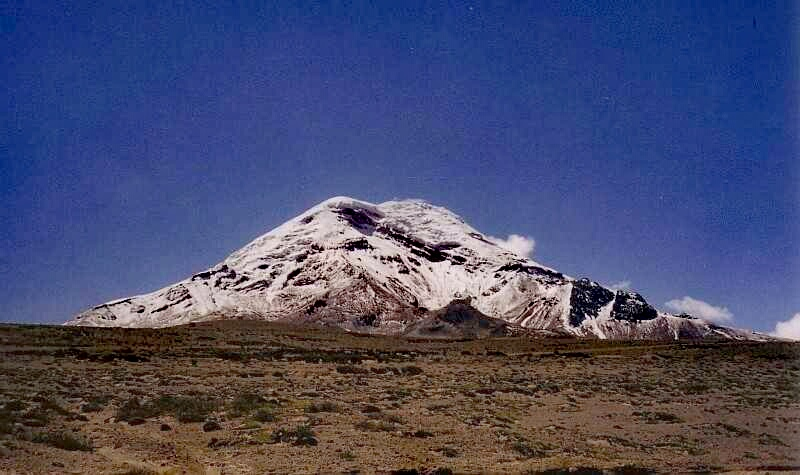
Chimborazo - 6,267 m (20,561 ft)

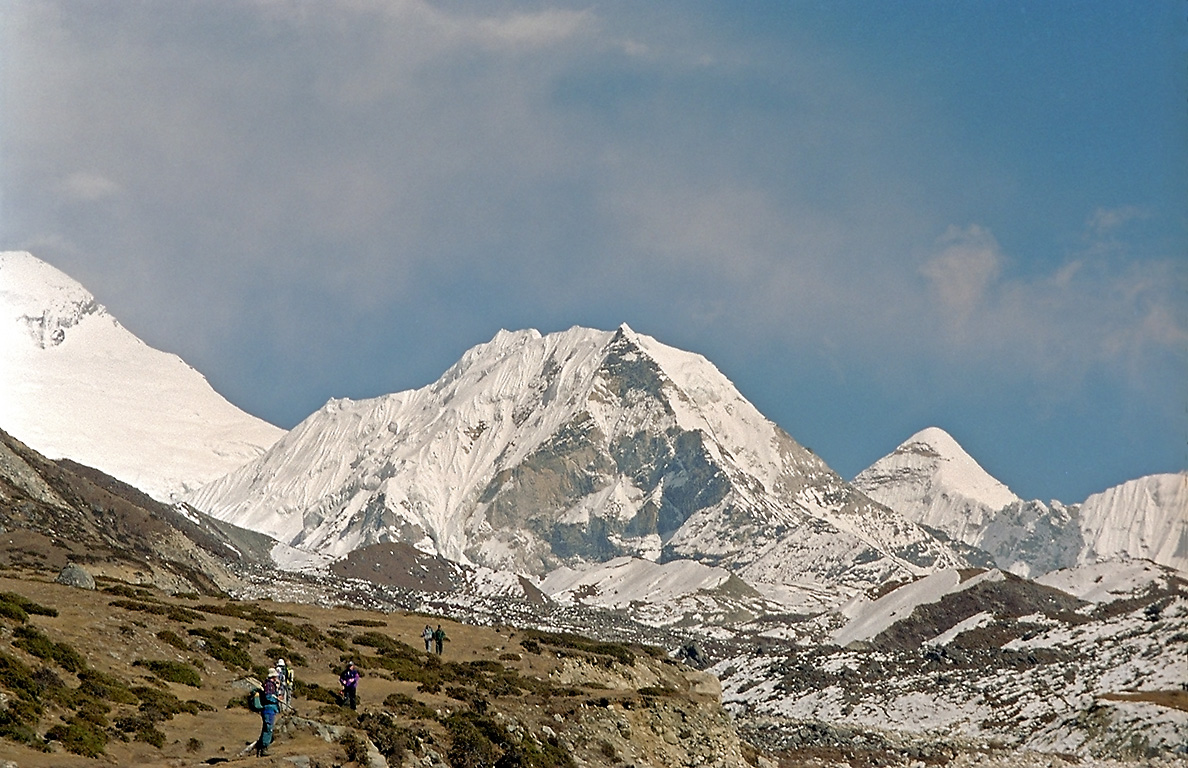
Imja Tse - 6,160 m (20,210 ft)

Mountain	Metres	Feet	Location and notes
Machapuchare	6,993	22,943	Annapurna Himalaya, Nepal – Officially unclimbed (attempts not allowed)
Laila Peak (Haramosh Valley)	6,985	22,917	Karakoram, Pakistan
Kang Guru	6,981	22,904	Manaslu Himalaya, Nepal – 2005 avalanche kills 18
Gasherbrum VI	6,979	22,897	Karakoram, Pakistan
Karun Kuh	6,977	22,890	Karakoram, Pakistan
Ulugh Muztagh	6,973	22,877	Kunlun Mountains, Often misquoted as 7,723 m
Aconcagua	6,961	22,838	Andes, Argentina – Highest in both the Western and Southern Hemispheres, highest outside Asia
Sangemarmar Sar	6,949	22,799	Karakoram, Pakistan
Kedarnath (mountain)	6,940	22,770	Himalayas, India
K7	6,934	22,749	Karakoram – Pakistan
Panchchuli	6,904	22,651	Himalayas, India
Thalay Sagar	6,904	22,651	Himalayas, India
Lunkho e Dosare	6,901	22,641	Hindu Kush, Afghanistan-Pakistan
Lunag Ri	6,895	22,621	Himalaya, Nepal-China
Ojos del Salado	6,891	22,608	Andes, Argentina-Chile – Highest volcano on Earth
Siniolchu	6,888	22,598	Kangchenjunga Himalaya, India (Sikkim)
Kanjiroba	6,883	22,582	Himalayas, Nepal
Bairiga	6,882	22,579	Kangri Garpo
Koyo Zom	6,872	22,546	Hindu Kush, Pakistan
Nanda Kot	6,861	22,510	Himalayas, India (Uttarakhand)
Kubi Gangri	6,859	22,503	Himalayas, Nepal/China
Angel Sar	6,858	22,500	Karakoram, Pakistan
Bhagirathi Parbat I	6,856	22,493	Himalayas, India (Uttarakhand)
Jethi Bahurani	6,850	22,470	Himalayas, Nepal
Chongra Peak	6,830	22,410	Nanga Parbat Himalaya, Pakistan
Chomo Yummo	6,829	22,405	Sikkim, India/China
Reo Purgyil	6,816	22,362	Western Himalaya, India border – Highest in Himachal Pradesh
Ama Dablam	6,812	22,349	Himalayas, Nepal (Khumbu)
Monte Pissis	6,795	22,293	Andes, Argentina – Third highest in Western Hemisphere
Kangtega	6,782	22,251	Himalayas, Nepal
Biarchedi	6,781	22,247	Karakoram, Pakistan
Huascarán Sur	6,768	22,205	Andes, Peru – Highest
Cerro Bonete	6,759	22,175	Andes, Argentina
Nevado Tres Cruces	6,749	22,142	Andes, Argentina/Chile
Kawagarbo	6,740	22,110	Hengduan Mountains, China (Yunnan/Tibet)
Llullaillaco	6,739	22,110	Andes, Argentina/Chile
Cho Polu	6,735	22,096	Himalayas, Nepal (Khumbu)
Kangju Kangri	6,725	22,064	Karakoram, India (Ladakh)
Changla	6,721	22,051	Himalayas, Nepal/China
Mercedario	6,720	22,050	Andes, Argentina
Mount Pandim	6,691	21,952	Himalayas, India (Sikkim)
Num Ri	6,677	21,906	Himalayas, Nepal (Khumbu)
Lungser Kangri	6,666	21,870	Ladakh, Himalayas, India (Ladakh)
Meru Peak	6,660	21,850	Himalayas, India
Gul Lasht Zom	6,657	21,841	Hindu Kush, Pakistan
Huascarán Norte	6,655	21,834	Andes, Peru
Khumbutse	6,640	21,780	Himalayas, Nepal (Khumbu)/China – First peak west of Everest
Mount Kailash	6,638	21,778	Transhimalaya, western China – Officially unclimbed (attempts not allowed)
Yerupajá	6,635	21,768	Andes, Peru
Nevado Tres Cruces Central	6,629	21,749	Andes, Chile
Thamserku	6,623	21,729	Himalayas, Nepal (Khumbu)
Geladaindong Peak	6,621	21,722	Tanggula, China (Qinghai)
Incahuasi	6,621	21,722	Andes, Argentina/Chile
Pangpoche	6,620	21,720	Himalayas, Nepal
Manirang	6,597	21,644	Himalayas, India (Himachal Pradesh)
Nilkantha	6,596	21,640	Himalayas, India (Uttarakhand)
Phuparash Peak	6,574	21,568	Karakoram, Pakistan
Sickle Moon Peak	6,574	21,568	Himalayas, India (Jammu and Kashmir)
Tupungato	6,570	21,560	Andes, Argentina/Chile
Buni Zom	6,542	21,463	Hindu Raj, Pakistan
Nevado Sajama	6,542	21,463	Andes, Bolivia – Highest
Ghamubar Zom	6,518	21,385	Hindu Kush, Pakistan
Singu Chuli	6,501	21,329	Annapurna Himalayas, Nepal
Taboche	6,501	21,329	Himalayas, Nepal (Khumbu)
Cerro El Muerto	6,488	21,286	Andes, Argentina/Chile
Mera Peak	6,476	21,247	Himalayas, Nepal (Khumbu)
Hiunchuli	6,441	21,132	Annapurna Himalaya, Nepal
Cholatse	6,440	21,130	Himalayas, Nepal (Khumbu)
Illimani	6,438	21,122	Andes, Bolivia
Ancohuma	6,427	21,086	Andes, Bolivia
Coropuna	6,425	21,079	Andes, Peru
Antofalla	6,409	21,027	Andes, Argentina
Kang Yatze	6,400	21,000	Himalayas, India (Ladakh)
Huandoy	6,395	20,981	Andes, Peru
Ausangate	6,384	20,945	Andes, Peru
Chapaev Peak	6,371	20,902	Tian Shan, Kyrgyzstan
Illampu	6,368	20,892	Andes, Bolivia
Kusum Kangguru	6,367	20,889	Himalayas, Nepal (Khumbu)
Kinnaur Kailash	6,349	20,830	Himalayas, Kinnaur, India (Himachal Pradesh)
Parinaquta	6,348	20,827	Andes, Bolivia/Chile
Siula Grande	6,344	20,814	Andes, Peru
Bamba Dhura	6,334	20,781	Himalayas, India (Uttarakhand)
Chinchey	6,309	20,699	Andes, Peru
Ampato	6,288	20,630	Andes, Peru
Amne Machin	6,282	20,610	Kunlun Mountains, China (Qinghai)
Pomerape	6,282	20,610	Andes, Bolivia/Chile
Palcaraju	6,274	20,584	Andes, Peru
Salcantay	6,271	20,574	Andes, Peru
Chimborazo	6,267	20,561	Andes, Ecuador – Furthest point from Earth's center
Mount Siguniang	6,250	20,510	Qionglai Mountains, China (Sichuan)
Grid Nie Mountain	6,224	20,420	Hengduan Mountains, China (Sichuan)
Yuzhu Peak	6,224	20,420	Kunlun Mountains, China (Qinghai)
Genyen Massif	6,204	20,354	Shaluli Range, China (Sichuan)
Kongde Ri	6,187	20,299	Himalayas, Nepal (Khumbu)
Aucanquilcha	6,176	20,262	Andes, Chile
Imja Tse	6,189	20,305	Himalayas, Nepal (Khumbu)
Denali (Mount McKinley)	6,190	20,310	Alaska Range, United States (Alaska) – Highest in North America
Stok Kangri	6,137	20,135	Himalayas, India (Ladakh)
Lobuche	6,119	20,075	Himalayas, Nepal (Khumbu)
Marmolejo	6,108	20,039	Andes, Argentina/Chile
Laila Peak (Hushe Valley)	6,096	20,000	Karakoram, Pakistan
Pisang Peak	6,091	19,984	Annapurna Himalaya, Nepal
Huayna Potosí	6,088	19,974	Andes, Bolivia
Aracar	6,082	19,954	Andes, Argentina
Chachakumani	6,074	19,928	Andes, Bolivia
Chachani	6,057	19,872	Andes, Peru
Mianzimu	6,054	19,862	Yunnan, China
Acotango	6,052	19,856	Andes, Bolivia/Chile
Socompa	6,051	19,852	Andes, Argentina/Chile
Minglik Sar	6,050	19,850	Karakoram, Pakistan
Acamarachi	6,046	19,836	Andes, Chile
Tocllaraju	6,034	19,797	Andes, Peru
Shayaz	6,026	19,770	Hindu Kush, Pakistan
Hualca Hualca	6,025	19,767	Andes, Peru
Uturunku	6,020	19,750	Andes, Bolivia
Mitre Peak	6,010	19,720	Karakoram, Pakistan

== 5,000 metres ==
Mountains between 5,000 and 6,000 metres (16,404 ft and 19,685 ft)

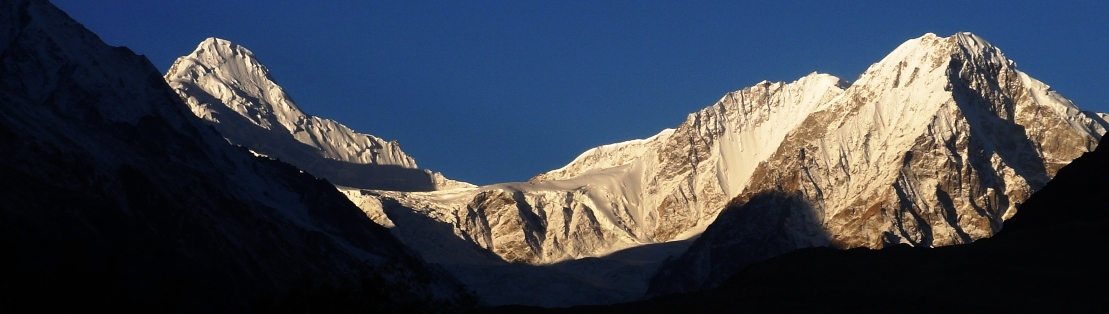
Laila Peak (left) and the upper Rupal Glacier – 5,959 m (19,551 ft)

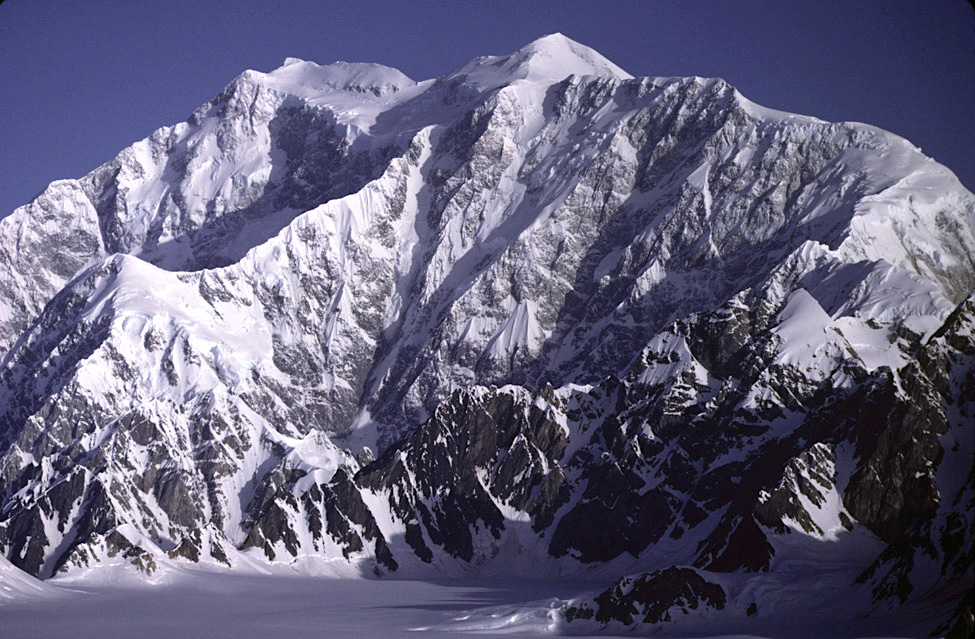
Mount Logan – 5,959 m (19,551 ft)

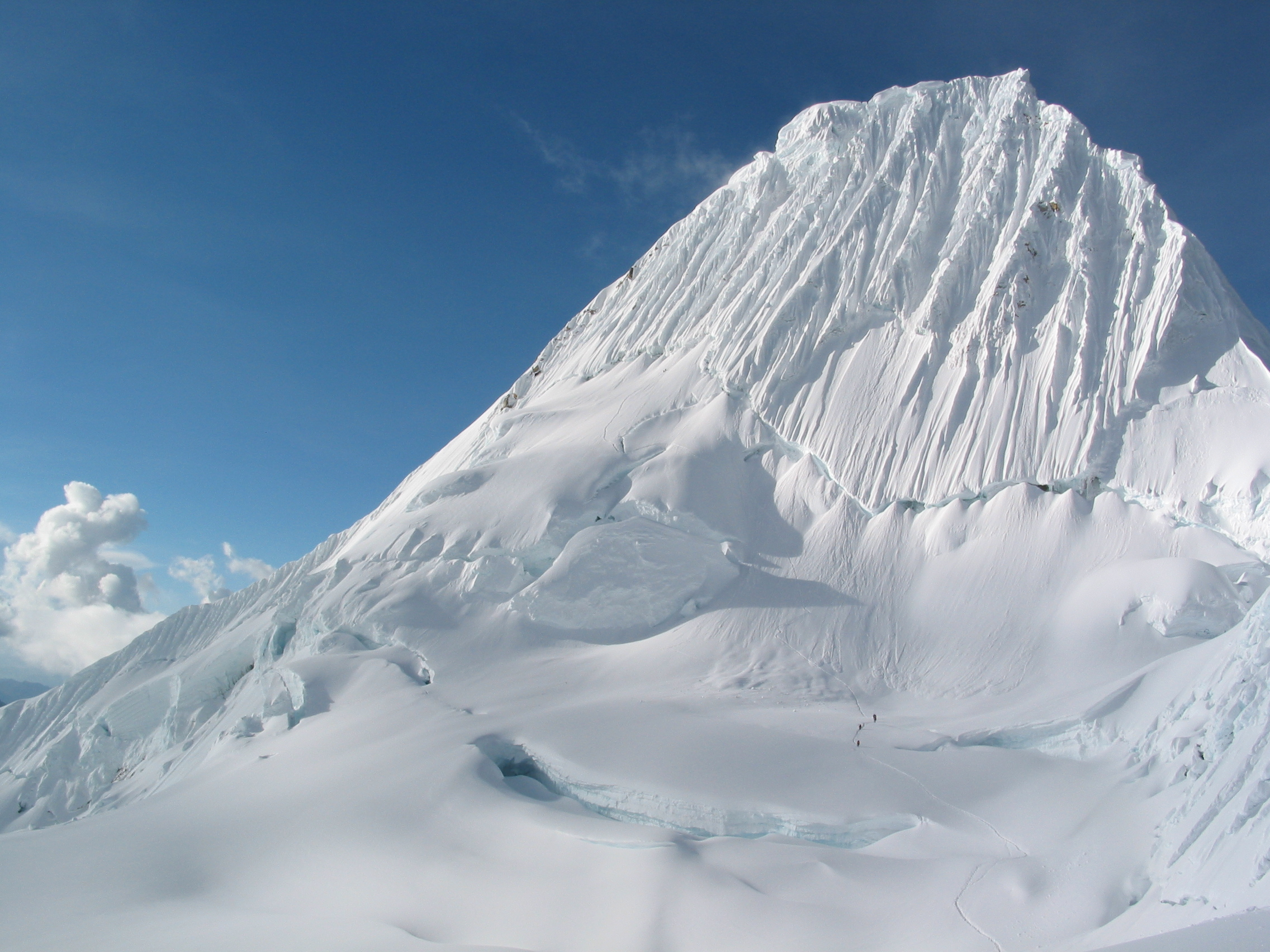
Alpamayo – 5,947 m (19,511 ft)

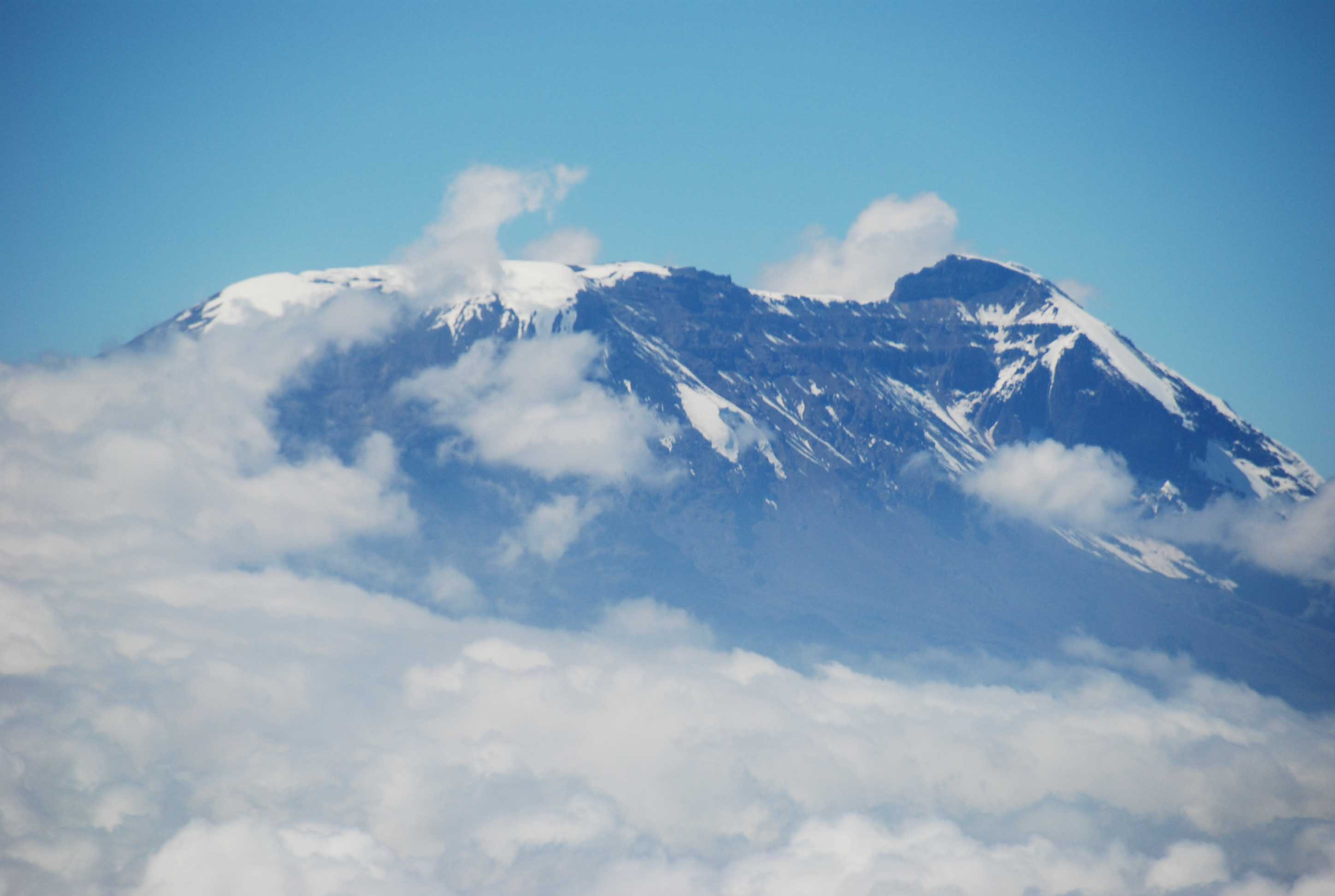
Kilimanjaro – 5,895 m (19,341 ft)

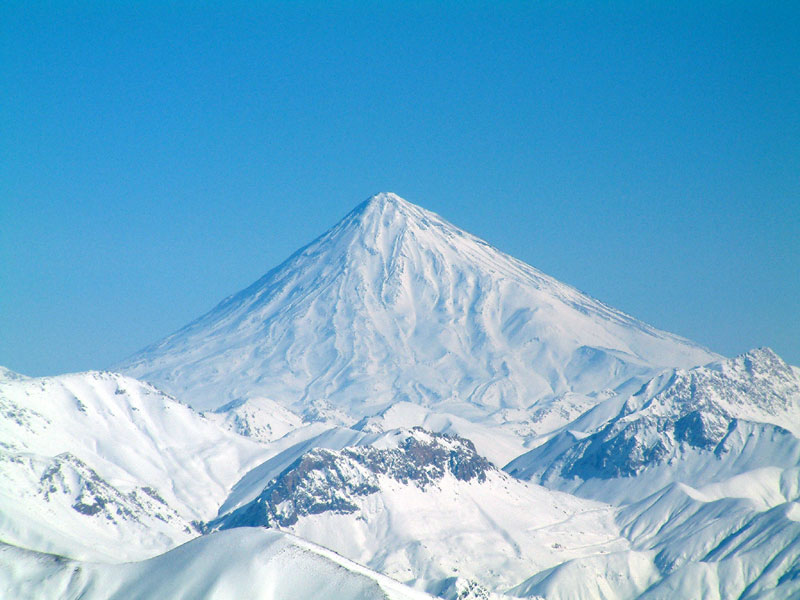
Damavand – 5,610 m (18,406 ft)

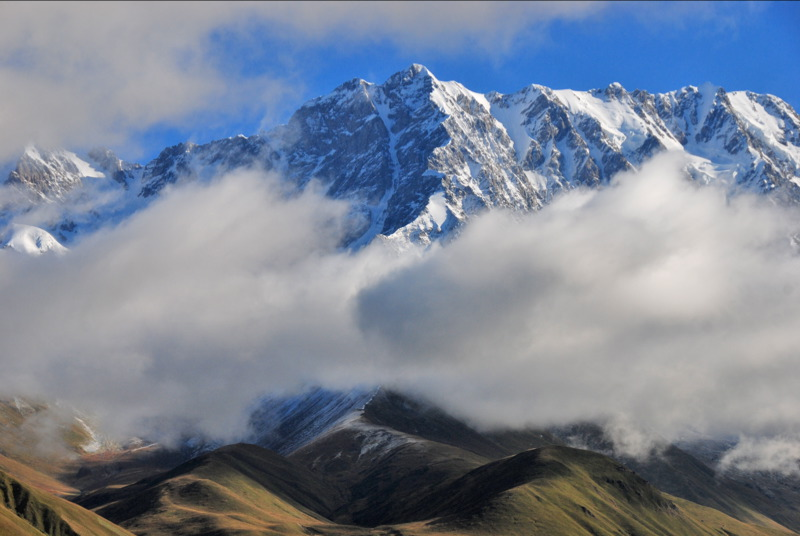
Shkhara – 5,201 m (17,064 ft)

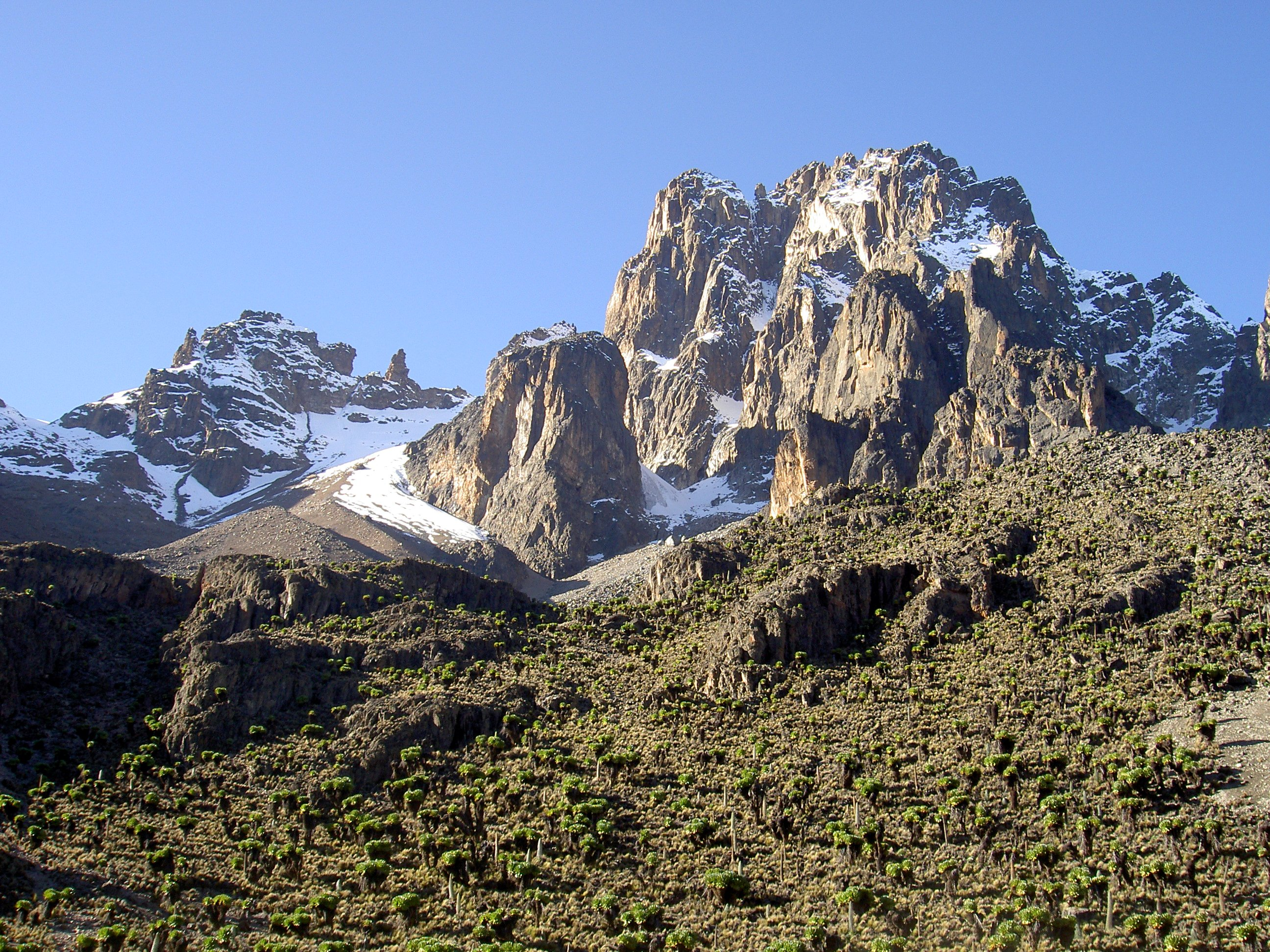
Mount Kenya – 5,199 m (17,057 ft)

Mountain	Metres	Feet	Range	Location and notes
Laila Peak	5,971	19,590	Himalaya	Pakistan
Mount Logan	5,959	19,551	Saint Elias Mountains	Yukon, Canada – Highest in Canada
Alpamayo	5,947	19,511	Andes	Peru
Cerro Lípez	5,929	19,452	Andes	Bolivia
Licancabur	5,920	19,420	Andes	Bolivia/Chile
Falak Sar	5,918	19,416	Hindu Kush	Pakistan
Cotopaxi	5,897	19,347	Andes	Ecuador – Second highest in Ecuador
Mount Kilimanjaro	5,895	19,341	Eastern Rift mountains	Tanzania – Highest in Africa
Hkakabo Razi	5,881	19,295	Himalayas	Myanmar – Highest in Myanmar and Southeast Asia
Nupla	5,878	19,285	Khumbu Himalayas	Nepal
Gamlang Razi	5,870	19,260	Himalayas	Myanmar
San José	5,856	19,213	Andes	Chile
Nevado Mariposa	5,842	19,167	Andes	Peru
El Misti	5,822	19,101	Andes	Peru
Altun Shan	5,798	19,022	Altyn-Tagh	Gansu, China
Cayambe	5,790	19,000	Andes	Ecuador – Third highest in Ecuador
Pico Cristóbal Colón	5,776	18,950	Sierra Nevada de Santa Marta	Colombia – Highest coastal mountain
Antisana	5,753	18,875	Andes	Ecuador
Nevado Pisco	5,752	18,871	Andes	Peru
Nevado Anallajsi	5,750	18,860	Andes	Bolivia
Pokalde	5,745	18,848	Khumbu Himalayas	Nepal – 7 km SW of Everest
Peak 5710	5,710	18,730	Himalayas	Myanmar
Ubinas	5,672	18,609	Andes	Peru – Active volcano (2006)
Pichu Pichu	5,664	18,583	Andes	Peru
Mount Elbrus	5,642	18,510	Caucasus Mountains	North Caucasus, Russia – Highest in Caucasus
Mehrbani Peak	5,639	18,501	Karakoram	Pakistan
Pico de Orizaba	5,636	18,491	Trans-Mexican Volcanic Belt	Mexico – Highest in Mexico
Mount Damavand	5,610	18,410	Alborz	Iran – Highest in Iran and ME, highest volcano in Asia
Nevado Mismi	5,597	18,363	Andes	Peru – Glacial source of the Amazon River
Jade Dragon Snow Mountain	5,596	18,360	Hengduan Mountains	Yunnan, China
Lascar Volcano	5,592	18,346	Andes	Chile
Mount Xuebaoding	5,588	18,333	Min Mountains	Sichuan, China
Kala Patthar	5,545	18,192	Khumbu Himalayas	Nepal – Popular trekking peak
Mount Saint Elias	5,489	18,009	Saint Elias Mountains	Yukon, Canada/Alaska, US – Second highest in both countries
Concord Peak	5,469	17,943	Pamir Mountains	Afghanistan–Tajikistan
Dindaw Razi	5,464	17,927	Himalayas	Myanmar
Machoi Peak	5,458	17,907	Himalaya	India (Jammu and Kashmir)
El Plomo	5,450	17,880	Andes	Chile
Bogda Feng	5,445	17,864	Tien Shan	Xinjiang, China
Mount Little Xuebaoding	5,443	17,858	Min Mountains	Sichuan, China
Cerro El Plomo	5,434	17,828	Andes	Chile – Largest peak visible from Santiago on clear days
Popocatépetl	5,426	17,802	Trans-Mexican Volcanic Belt	Mexico – Second highest in Mexico
Kolahoi Peak	5,425	17,799	Himalaya	India (Jammu and Kashmir) – Highest in Kashmir Valley
Chacaltaya	5,421	17,785	Andes	Bolivia
Mount Pomiu	5,413	17,759	Qionglai Range	Sichuan, China
Ritacuba Blanco	5,410	17,750	Andes	Colombia
Haba Xueshan	5,396	17,703	Himalaya	Yunnan, China
Nevado del Ruiz	5,389	17,680	Andes	Colombia – 23,000 people died in 1985 eruption
Nevado del Huila	5,364	17,598	Andes	Colombia
El Altar	5,320	17,450	Andes	Ecuador
Mount Foraker	5,304	17,402	Alaska Range	Alaska, US
Mount Haramukh	5,300	17,400	Himalaya	India (Jammu and Kashmir)
Nevado del Tolima	5,276	17,310	Andes	Colombia
Maipo	5,264	17,270	Andes	Argentina/Chile
Illiniza	5,248	17,218	Andes	Ecuador
Point 5240	5,240	17,190	Himalaya	Ladakh, India
Sirbal Peak	5,236	17,178	Himalaya	Kashmir Valley, India (Jammu and Kashmir)
Sangay	5,230	17,160	Andes	Ecuador
Iztaccíhuatl	5,230	17,160	Trans-Mexican Volcanic Belt	Mexico – Third highest in Mexico
Mount Lucania	5,226	17,146	Saint Elias Mountains	Yukon, Canada – Third highest in Canada
Karakol Peak	5,216	17,113	Tian Shan	Kyrgyzstan
Dykh-Tau	5,205	17,077	Caucasus Mountains	North Caucasus, Russia – Second highest in the Caucasus
Shkhara	5,201	17,064	Caucasus Mountains	Georgia – Highest in Georgia
Vinicunca	5,200	17,100	Andes	Peru
Mount Kenya	5,199	17,057	Eastern Rift mountains	Kenya – Highest in Kenya
Malika Parbat	5,190	17,030	Himalaya	Kaghan Valley, Pakistan – Highest in Kaghan Valley of Pakistan
Amarnath Peak	5,186	17,014	Himalaya	Kashmir Valley, India (Jammu and Kashmir)
Laram Q'awa (Charaña)	5,182	17,001	Andes	Bolivia
King Peak	5,173	16,972	Saint Elias Mountains	Yukon, Canada – Fourth highest in Canada
Boris Yeltsin Peak	5,168	16,955	Teskey Ala-Too	Kyrgyzstan
Koshtan-Tau	5,150	16,900	Caucasus Mountains	North Caucasus, Russia
Mount Ararat	5,137	16,854		Turkey – Highest in Turkey
Mount Stanley	5,109	16,762	Ruwenzori Mountains	Democratic Republic of the Congo/Uganda – Third highest in Africa
Tami Razi	5,101	16,736	Himalayas	Myanmar
Mount Steele	5,073	16,644	Saint Elias Mountains	Yukon, Canada – Fifth highest in Canada
Mount Kazbek	5,055	16,585	Caucasus Mountains	Georgia – Third highest in the country
Janga	5,051	16,572	Caucasus Mountains	Georgia / North Caucasus, Russia – Second highest in Georgia
Tungurahua	5,023	16,480	Andes	Ecuador – Active volcano
Carihuairazo	5,018	16,463	Andes	Ecuador
Mount Bona	5,005	16,421	Saint Elias Mountains	Alaska, US – Also given as 5,030 m or 5,045m

== 4,000 metres ==
Mountains between 4,000 and 5,000 metres (13,123 ft and 16,404 ft)

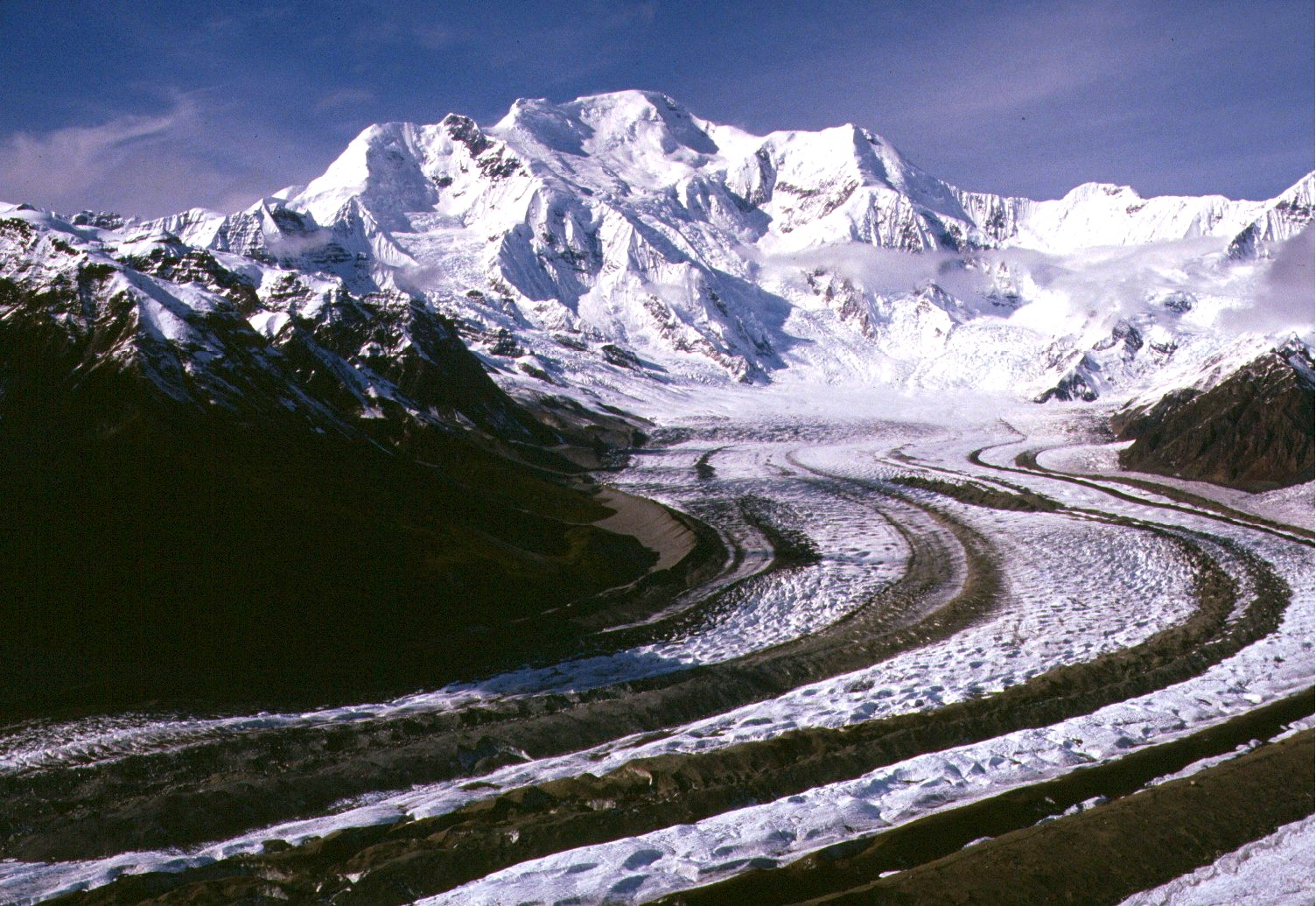
Mt. Blackburn – 4,996 m (16,391 ft)

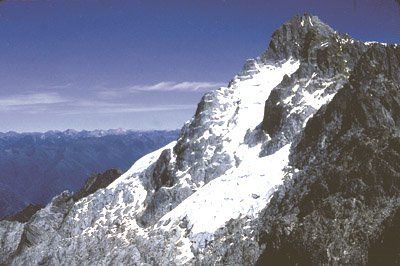
Pico Bolívar – 4,981 m (16,342 ft)

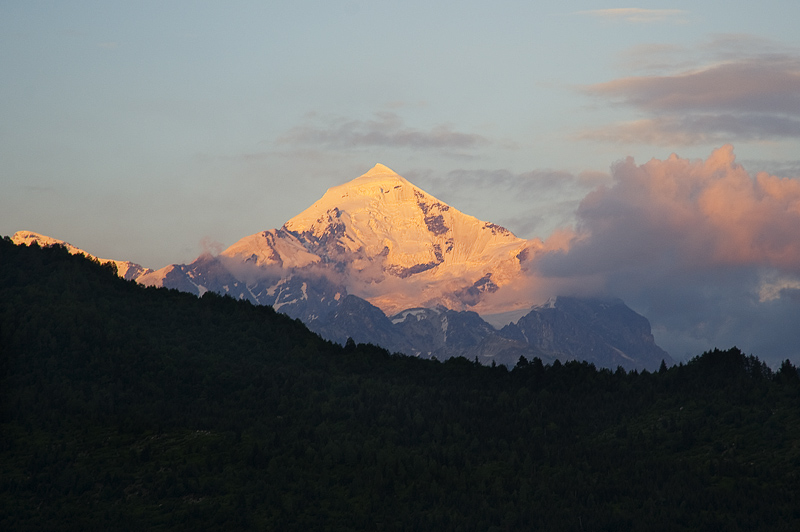
Tetnuldi – 4,858 m (15,938 ft)

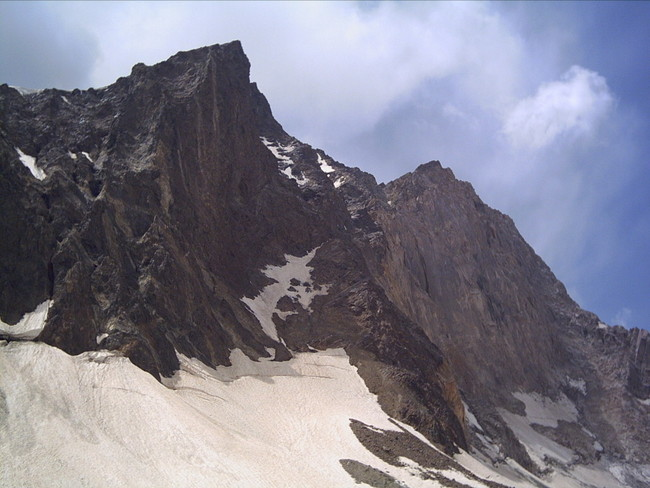
Alam Kuh – 4,650 m (15,256 ft)

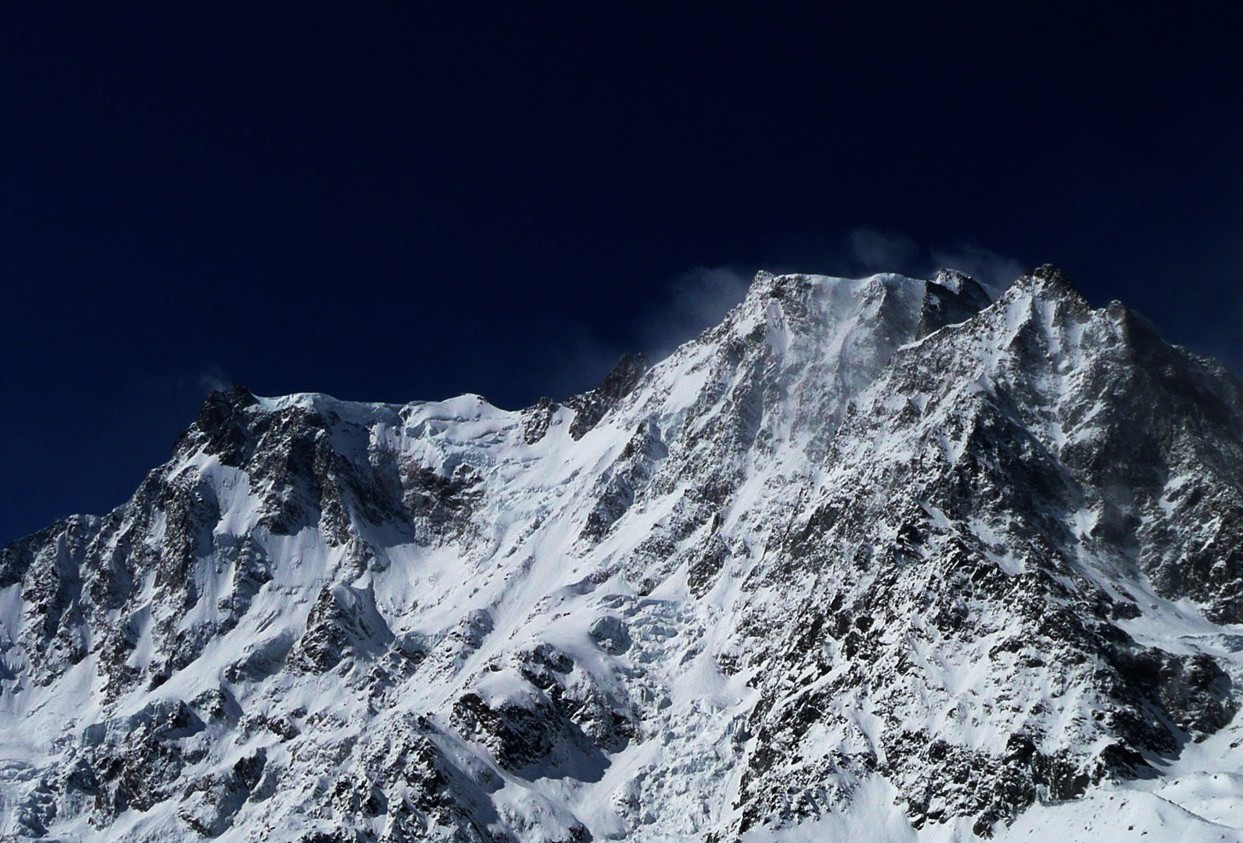
Dufourspitze of the Monte Rosa Massif– 4,634 m (15,203 ft)

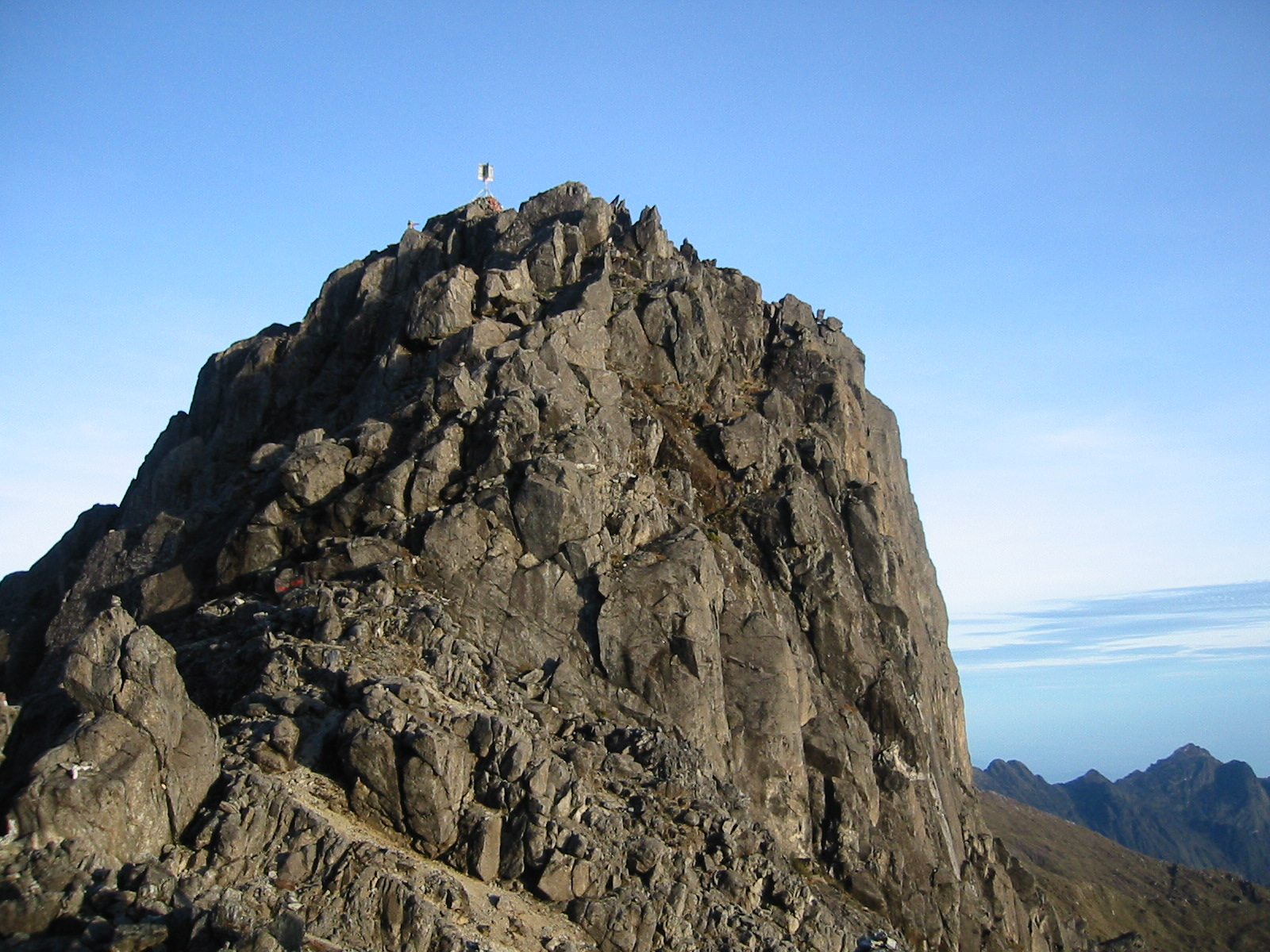
Mount Wilhelm – 4,509 m (14,793 ft)

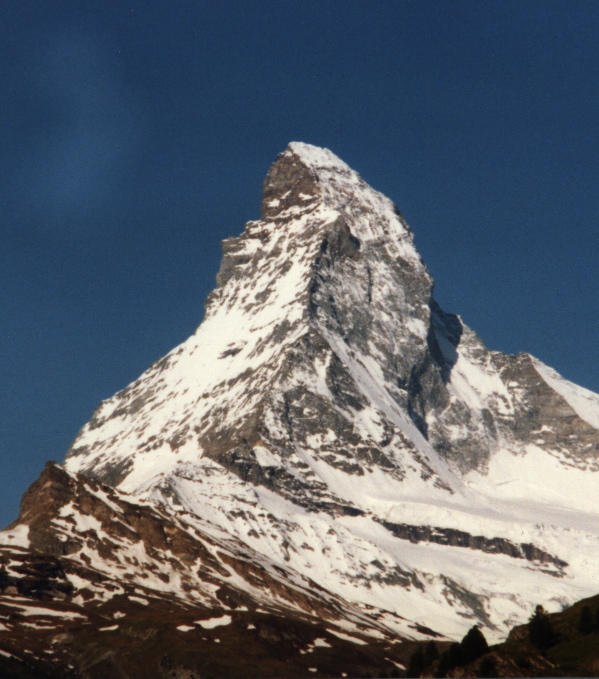
Matterhorn – 4,478 m (14,692 ft)

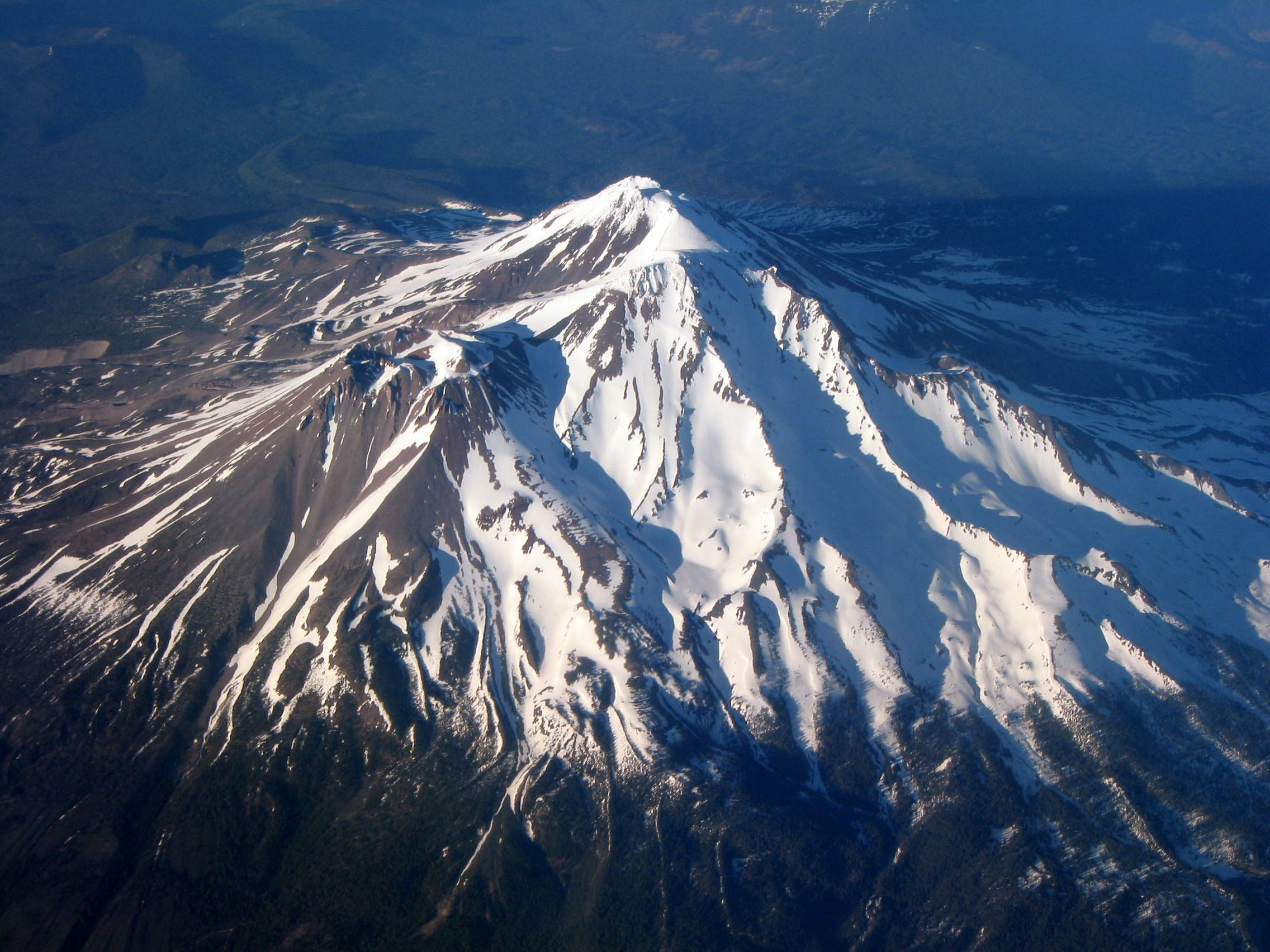
Mt. Shasta – 4,322 m (14,180 ft)

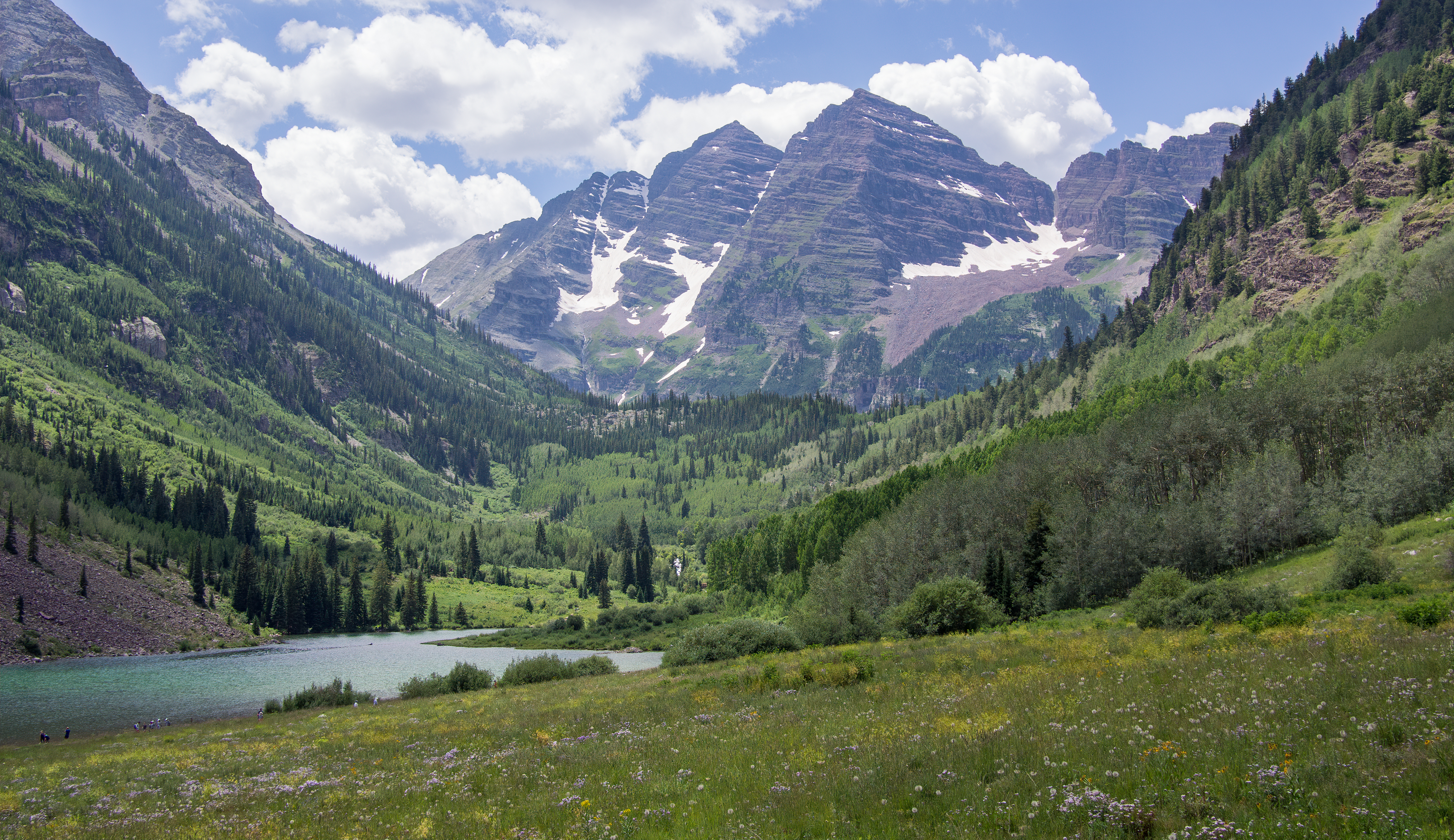
Maroon Bells – 4,315 m (14,157 ft)

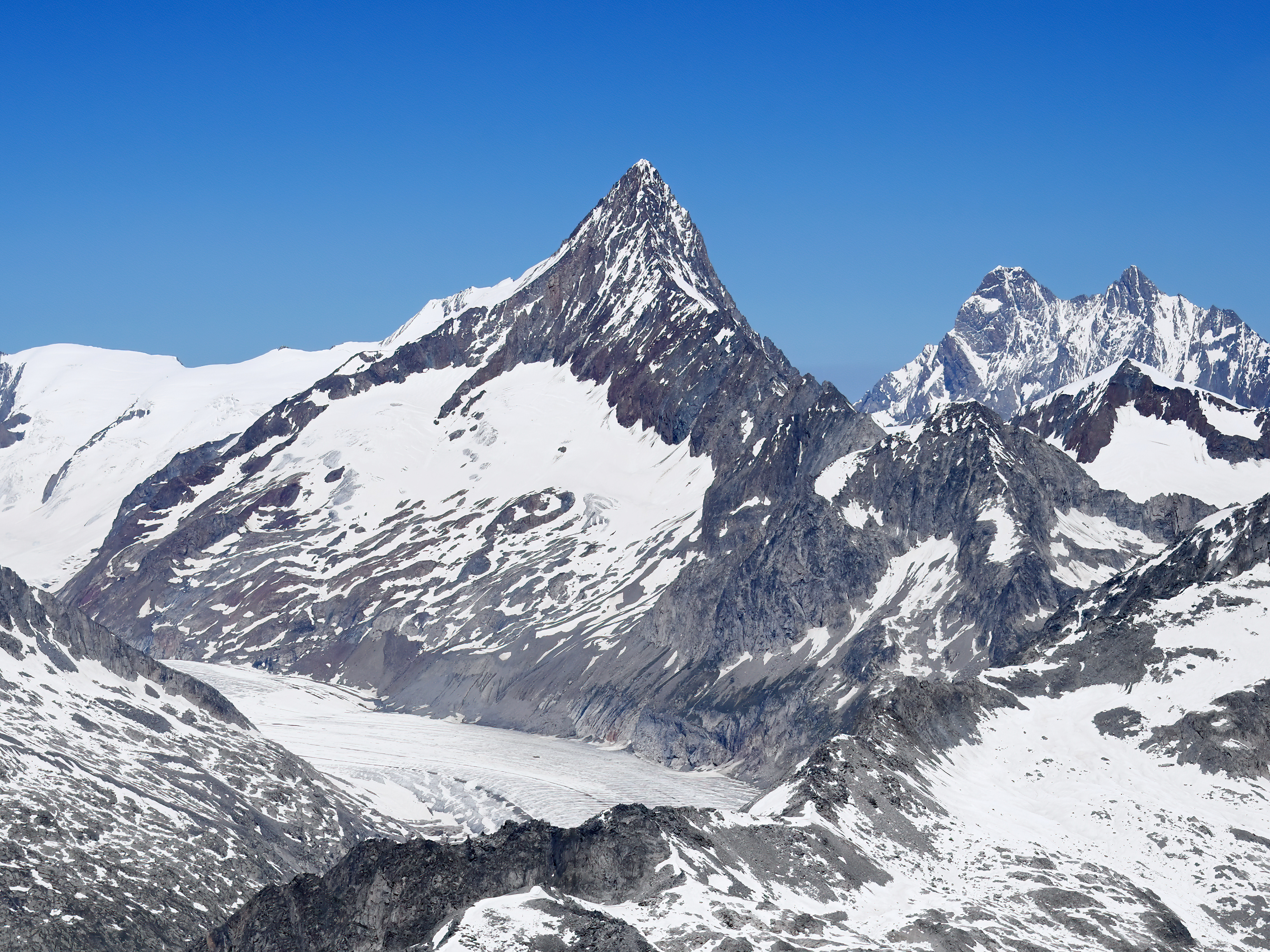
Finsteraarhorn – 4,274 m (14,022 ft)

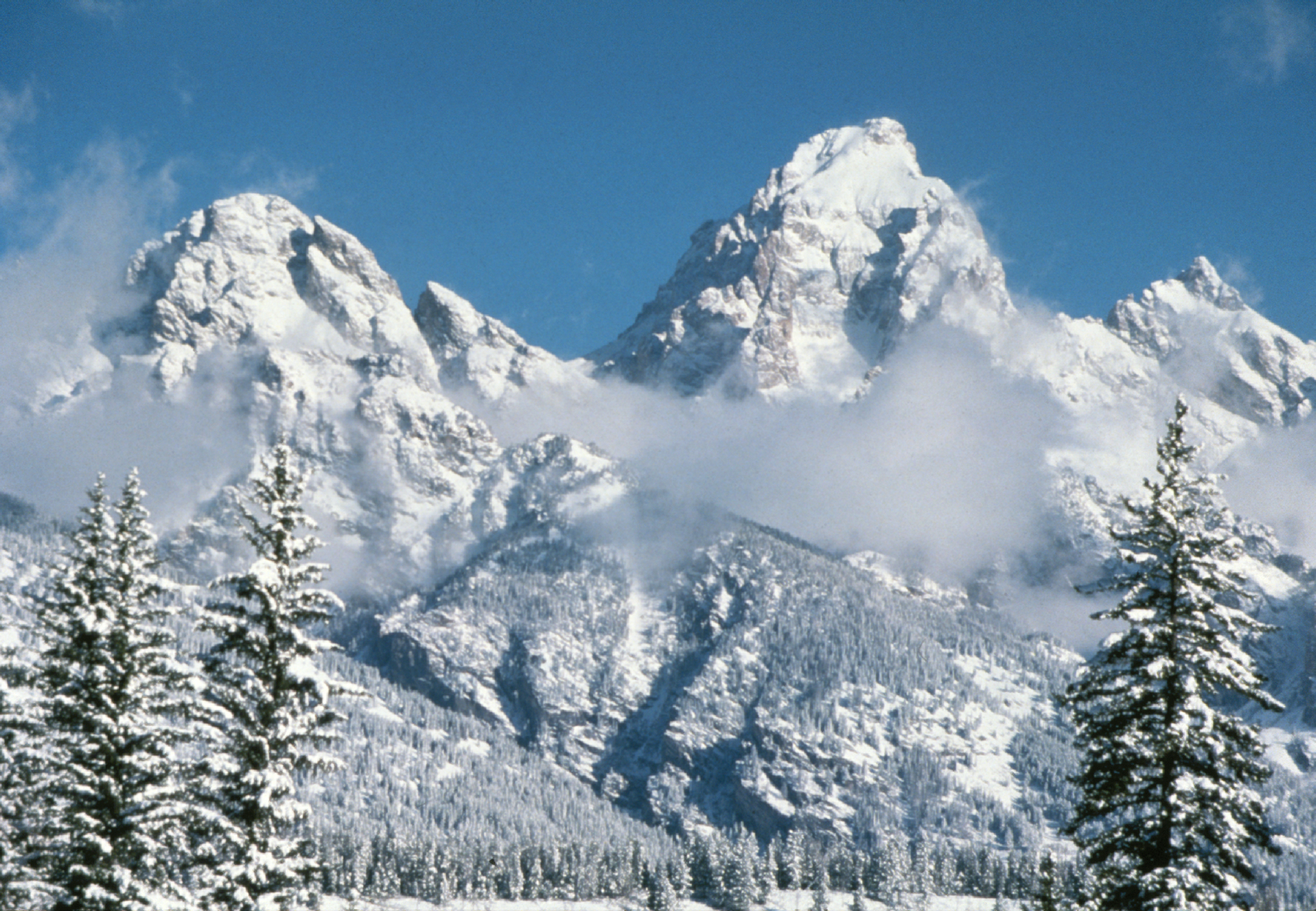
Grand Teton – 4,197 m (13,770 ft)

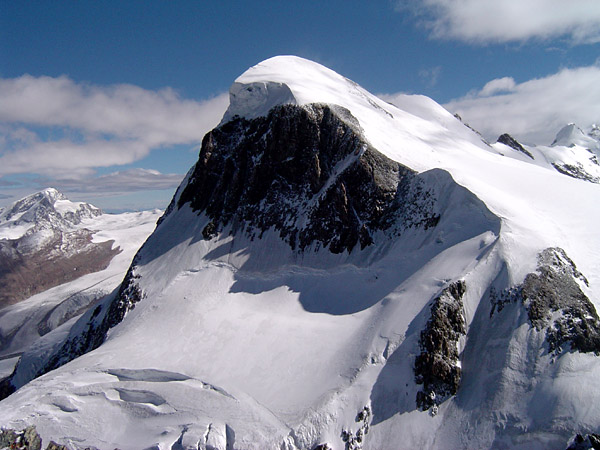
Breithorn – 4,164 m (13,661 ft)

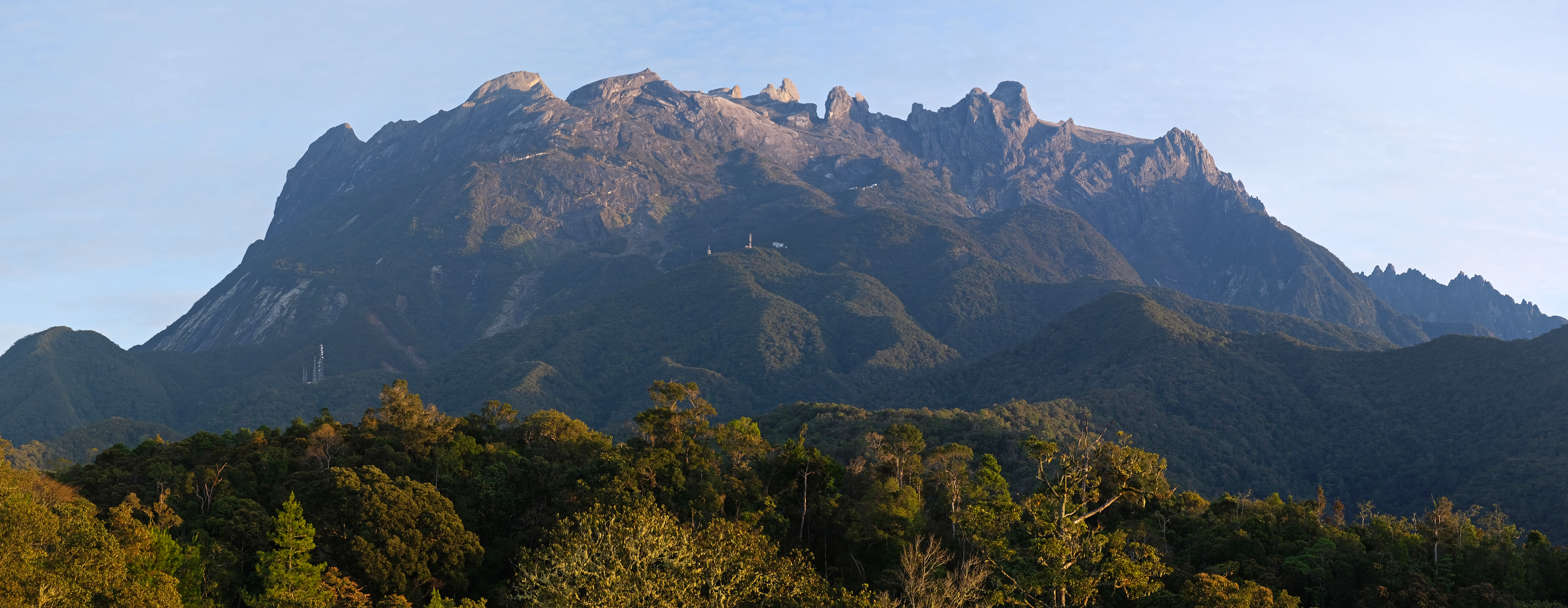
Mount Kinabalu – 4,095 m (13,435 ft)

Mountain	Metres	Feet	Location and notes
Mount Blackburn	4,996	16,391	Wrangell Mtns., Alaska, US (also given 5036 m)
Pico Bolívar	4,981	16,342	Sierra Nevada de Mérida, Andes, Venezuela – Highest in Venezuela
Talgar Peak	4,979	16,335	Tian Shan, Kazakhstan – Highest in northern Tian Shan
Shota Rustaveli Peak	4,960	16,270	Caucasus Mountains, Svaneti, Georgia/North Caucasus, Russia
Mount Sanford	4,949	16,237	Wrangell Mtns., Alaska, US
Pico Humboldt	4,940	16,210	Sierra Nevada de Mérida, Andes, Venezuela
Pin Bhaba Pass	4,930	16,170	Pin Valley/Spiti Valley, Himalayas, India
Vinson Massif	4,892	16,050	Sentinel Range, Ellsworth Mountains, Antarctica – Highest in Antarctica
Pico Bonpland	4,890	16,040	Sierra Nevada de Mérida, Andes, Venezuela
Mount Speke	4,890	16,040	Ruwenzori Mountains National Park, Uganda, Uganda
Puncak Jaya	4,884	16,024	Sudirman Range, Papua, Indonesia – Highest in Indonesia
Pico La Concha	4,870	15,980	Sierra Nevada de Mérida, Andes, Venezuela
Gistola	4,860	15,940	Caucasus Mountains, Svaneti, Georgia
Tetnuldi	4,858	15,938	Caucasus Mountains, Svaneti, Georgia
Mount Tyree	4,852	15,919	Sentinel Range, Ellsworth Mountains, Antarctica – Second highest in Antarctica
Huaynaputina	4,850	15,910	Andes, Peru
Alam Kuh	4,850	15,910	Alborz, Iran – Second highest in Iran
Mount Wood	4,842	15,886	Saint Elias Mountains, Yukon, Canada
Mount Vancouver	4,812	15,787	Saint Elias Mountains, Yukon, Canada
Sabalan	4,811	15,784	Iran
Mont Blanc	4,810	15,780	Mont Blanc massif, France/Italy – Highest in Alps
Corazón	4,790	15,720	Andes, Ecuador
Pichincha	4,784	15,696	Andes, Ecuador
Jimara	4,780	15,680	Khokh Range, Caucasus Mountains, Georgia
Mount Churchill	4,766	15,636	Saint Elias Mountains, Alaska, US
Cumbal	4,764	15,630	Nudo de los Pastos, Colombia
Puncak Mandala	4,760	15,620	Papua, Indonesia
Klyuchevskaya Sopka	4,750	15,580	Kamchatka, Russia
Puncak Trikora	4,750	15,580	Papua, Indonesia
Mont Blanc de Courmayeur	4,748	15,577	Mont Blanc massif, France/Italy
Sunset Peak	4,745	15,568	Himalaya, Kashmir Valley, India (Jammu and Kashmir)
Mount Slaggard	4,742	15,558	Saint Elias Mountains, Canada
Pico Piedras Blancas	4,740	15,550	Sierra de la Culata, Andes, Venezuela
Pico El Toro	4,730	15,520	Andes, Venezuela
Tatakooti Peak	4,725	15,502	Himalaya, Kashmir Valley, India (Jammu and Kashmir)
Rumiñahui	4,721	15,489	Andes, Ecuador
Pico El Leon	4,720	15,490	Andes, Venezuela
Ushba	4,710	15,450	Caucasus Mountains, Svaneti, Georgia
Volcán Domuyo	4,709	15,449	Andes, Argentina
Chiles	4,698	15,413	Nudo de los Pastos, Colombia/Ecuador
Pico Pan de Azucar	4,680	15,350	Sierra de la Culata, Andes, Venezuela
Naltar Peak	4,678	15,348	Pakistan
Mount Fairweather	4,663	15,299	Fairweather Range, Alaska, US
Pico Mucuñuque	4,660	15,290	Andes, Venezuela
Khazret Sultan	4,643	15,233	Gissar Range, Uzbekistan
Sierra Negra	4,640	15,220	Mexico
Dufourspitze (Monte Rosa)	4,634	15,203	Pennine Alps, Switzerland – Highest point in Switzerland
Dunantspitze (Monte Rosa)	4,632	15,197	Pennine Alps, Switzerland
Nordend (Monte Rosa)	4,609	15,121	Pennine Alps, Switzerland-Italy
Mount Gessi	4,578	15,020	Rwenzori
Mount Hubbard	4,577	15,016	Saint Elias Mountains
Nevado de Toluca	4,577	15,016	Mexico
Mount Meru	4,566	14,980	Tanzania
Zumsteinspitze (Monte Rosa)	4,563	14,970	Pennine Alps, Switzerland-Italy
Signalkuppe (Monte Rosa)	4,554	14,941	Pennine Alps, Switzerland-Italy
Dom	4,545	14,911	Pennine Alps, Switzerland
Ras Dashen	4,533	14,872	Ethiopia – Highest point in Ethiopia
Eastern Liskamm (Lyskamm)	4,533	14,872	Pennine Alps, Switzerland-Italy
Mount Bear	4,521	14,833	Saint Elias Mountains, Alaska, US
Mount Wilhelm	4,509	14,793	Bismarck Range, Papua New Guinea
Mount Karisimbi	4,507	14,787	Virunga Mountains, Rwanda/DRC
Mount Walsh	4,507	14,787	Saint Elias Mountains, Canada
Belukha Mountain	4,506	14,783	Altay Mountains, Russia
Weisshorn	4,506	14,783	Pennine Alps, Switzerland
Tebulosmta	4,493	14,741	Caucasus Mountains, Georgia/Chechnya, Russia
Täschhorn	4,491	14,734	Pennine Alps, Switzerland
Bazarduzu Dagi	4,485	14,715	Azerbaijan
Matterhorn	4,478	14,692	Pennine Alps, Switzerland/Italy
Mount Rutford	4,477	14,688	Sentinel Range, Ellsworth Mountains, Antarctica
Mont Maudit	4,465	14,649	Mont Blanc massif, France/Italy
Donguzorun	4,454	14,613	Caucasus Mountains, Georgia/Russia
Mount Shani	4,451	14,603	Caucasus Mountains, Georgia/Russia
Dena	4,448	14,593	Zagros Mountains, Iran
Vladimir Putin Peak	4,446	14,587	Kyrgyz Alatau, Kyrgyzstan
Cerro Negro de Mayasquer	4,445	14,583	Nudo de los Pastos, Colombia/Ecuador
Mount Hunter	4,442	14,573	Alaska Range, Alaska, US
Parrotspitze (Monte Rosa)	4,432	14,541	Pennine Alps, Switzerland-Italy
La Malinche	4,430	14,530	Cordillera Neovolcanica, Mexico
Mount Whitney	4,421	14,505	Sierra Nevada, California, US
Mount Alverstone	4,420	14,500	Saint Elias Mountains, Alaska, US/Yukon, Canada
University Peak	4,411	14,472	Saint Elias Mountains, Alaska, US
Aello Peak	4,403	14,446	Saint Elias Mountains, Alaska, US
Mount Elbert	4,402	14,442	Sawatch Range, Colorado, US
Mount Massive	4,395	14,419	Sawatch Range, Colorado, US
Mount Harvard	4,395	14,419	Sawatch Range, Colorado, US
Mount Rainier	4,392	14,409	Cascades, Washington, US
Apharwat Peak	4,390	14,400	Gulmarg, India (Jammu and Kashmir)
Kholeno	4,387	14,393	Alborz, Iran
Mount Williamson	4,382	14,377	Sierra Nevada, California, US
Tavan Bogd Uul	4,374	14,350	Bayan-Ölgii Province, Mongolia – Highest point in Mongolia
Blanca Peak	4,374	14,350	Rocky Mountains, Colorado, US
La Plata Peak	4,372	14,344	Sawatch Range, Colorado, US
Mount Giluwe	4,368	14,331	Papua New Guinea
Burchula	4,364	14,318	Caucasus Mountains, Georgia
Uncompahgre Peak	4,361	14,308	San Juan Mountains, Colorado, US
Dent Blanche	4,357	14,295	Pennine Alps, Switzerland
Crestone Peak	4,357	14,295	Sangre de Cristo Range, Colorado, US
Khüiten Peak	4,356	14,291	Altai Range, Mongolia, China
Mount Lincoln	4,354	14,285	Mosquito Range, Colorado, US
Azad Kuh	4,355	14,288	Alborz, Iran
Grays Peak	4,350	14,270	Front Range, Colorado, US
Mount Blue Sky	4,350	14,270	Front Range, Colorado, US
Quandary Peak	4,350	14,270	Tenmile Range, Colorado, US
Lalveri	4,350	14,270	Caucasus Mountains, Svaneti, Georgia
Mount Antero	4,349	14,268	Sawatch Range, Colorado, US
Torreys Peak	4,349	14,268	Front Range, Colorado, US
Castle Peak	4,348	14,265	Elk Mountains, Colorado, US
Longs Peak	4,346	14,259	Front Range, Colorado, US
McArthur Peak	4,344	14,252	Saint Elias Mountains, Yukon
Mount Wilsion	4,342	14,245	San Juan Mountains, Colorado, US
White Mountain Peak	4,342	14,245	White Mountains, California, US
North Palisade	4,341	14,242	Sierra Nevada, California, US
Ludwigshöhe (Monte Rosa)	4,341	14,242	Pennine Alps, Switzerland-Italy
Mount Shavano	4,337	14,229	Sawatch Range, Colorado, US
Colima	4,330	14,210	Mexico
Crestone Needle	4,327	14,196	Sangre de Cristo Range, Colorado, US
Mount Belford	4,327	14,196	Sawatch Range, Colorado, US
Mount Princeton	4,327	14,196	Sawatch Range, Colorado, US
Mount Shasta	4,322	14,180	California, US
Mount Elgon	4,321	14,177	Uganda-Kenya
Mount Bross	4,320	14,170	Mosquito Range, Colorado, US
Kit Carson Mountain	4,318	14,167	Sangre de Cristo Range, Colorado, US
Mount Wrangell	4,317	14,163	Alaska, US
Maroon Peak	4,315	14,157	Elk Mountains, Colorado, US
Tabeguache Peak	4,315	14,157	Sawatch Range, Colorado, US
El Diente Peak	4,315	14,157	San Juan Mountains, Colorado, US
Mount Sill	4,314	14,154	Sierra Nevada, California, US
Grand Combin	4,313	14,150	Pennine Alps, Switzerland
Mount Oxford (Colorado)	4,313	14,150	Sawatch Range, Colorado, US
Mount Sneffels	4,312	14,147	San Juan Mountains, Colorado, US
Mount Democrat	4,312	14,147	Mosquito Range, Colorado, US
Capitol Peak	4,307	14,131	Elk Mountains, Colorado, US
Pikes Peak	4,302	14,114	Front Range, Colorado, US
Mount Russell	4,296	14,094	Sierra Nevada, California, US
Snowmass Mountain	4,295	14,091	Elk Mountains, Colorado, US
Lenzspitze	4,294	14,088	Pennine Alps, Switzerland
Mount Eolus	4,292	14,081	San Juan Mountains, Colorado, US
Windom Peak	4,292	14,081	San Juan Mountains, Colorado, US
Challenger Point	4,292	14,081	Sangre de Cristo Range, Colorado, US
Mount Columbia	4,291	14,078	Sawatch Range, Colorado, US
Mount Adishi	4,290	14,070	Caucasus Mountains, Svaneti, Georgia
Mount Augusta	4,290	14,070	Saint Elias Mountains, Alaska, US
Humboldt Peak (Colorado)	4,287	14,065	Sangre de Cristo Range, Colorado, US
Split Mountain	4,287	14,065	Sierra Nevada, California, US
Mount Bierstadt	4,286	14,062	Front Range, Colorado, US
Diklosmta	4,285	14,058	Caucasus Mountains, Tusheti, Georgia
Sunlight Peak	4,285	14,058	San Juan Mountains, Colorado, US
Mount Sidley	4,285	14,058	Volcanic Seven Summits, Antarctica
Missouri Mountain	4,282	14,049	Sawatch Range, Colorado, US
Culebra Peak	4,282	14,049	Colorado, US
Handies Peak	4,281	14,045	San Juan Mountains, Colorado, US
Ellingwood Point	4,280	14,040	Sangre de Cristo Range, Colorado, US
Mount Lindsey	4,280	14,040	Sangre de Cristo Range, Colorado, US
Little Bear Peak	4,279	14,039	Sangre de Cristo Range, Colorado, US
Mount Sherman	4,278	14,035	Mosquito Range, Colorado, US
Redcloud Peak	4,277	14,032	San Juan Mountains, Colorado, US
Galeras	4,276	14,029	Nudo de los Pastos, Colombia
Mount Langley	4,275	14,026	Sierra Nevada, California, US
Finsteraarhorn	4,274	14,022	Bernese Alps, Switzerland
Pyramid Peak	4,273	14,019	Elk Mountains, Colorado, US
Mount Tyndall	4,273	14,019	Sierra Nevada, California, US
Wilson Peak	4,272	14,016	San Juan Mountains, Colorado, US
Mount Muir	4,272	14,016	Sierra Nevada, California, US
San Luis Peak	4,271	14,012	San Juan Mountains, Colorado, US
Wetterhorn Peak	4,271	14,012	San Juan Mountains, Colorado, US
Middle Palisade	4,271	14,012	Sierra Nevada, California, US
Huron Peak	4,269	14,006	Sawatch Range, Colorado, US
Mount of the Holy Cross	4,269	14,006	Sawatch Range, Colorado, US
Thunderbolt Peak	4,268	14,003	Sierra Nevada, California, US
Sunshine Peak	4,268	14,003	San Juan Mountains, Colorado, US
Mount Strickland	4,260	13,980	Saint Elias Mountains, Yukon, Canada
Pigeon Peak	4,259	13,973	San Juan Mountains, Colorado, US
Mount Kennedy	4,250	13,940	Saint Elias Mountains, Yukon, Canada
Pointe Bayeux	4,258	13,970	Graian Alps, Mont Blanc massif, France
Mont Blanc du Tacul	4,248	13,937	Graian Alps, Mont Blanc massif, France
Stecknadelhorn	4,241	13,914	Pennine Alps, Switzerland
Nevado de Colima	4,240	13,910	cordillère Néovolcanique, Mexico
Phoenix Peak	4,237	13,901	San Juan Mountains, Colorado, US
Avalanche Peak	4,228	13,871	Saint Elias Mountains, Yukon, Canada
Castor	4,223	13,855	Pennine Alps, Switzerland
Zinalrothorn	4,221	13,848	Pennine Alps, Switzerland
Volcán Tajumulco	4,220	13,850	Guatemala
Hohberghorn	4,219	13,842	Pennine Alps, Switzerland
Turret Peak	4,217	13,835	Needle Mountains, Colorado, US
Mount Darwin	4,216	13,832	Sierra Nevada, California, US
Mount Hayes	4,216	13,832	Alaska, US
Sacabaya	4,215	13,829	Bolivia
Grandes Jorasses	4,208	13,806	Mont Blanc massif, France/Italy
Gannett Peak	4,208	13,806	Wind River Range, Wyoming, US
Mauna Kea	4,207	13,802	Hawaii, US
Alphubel	4,206	13,799	Pennine Alps, Switzerland
Cofre de Perote	4,201	13,783	Mexico
Zard-Kuh	4,200	13,800	Zagros Mountains, Iran
Shah Alborz	4,200	13,800	Alborz, Iran
Rimpfischhorn	4,199	13,776	Pennine Alps, Switzerland
Grand Teton	4,199	13,776	Teton Range, Wyoming, US
Mount Cook	4,196	13,766	Saint Elias Mountains, Canada/US
Aletschhorn	4,192	13,753	Bernese Alps, Switzerland
Strahlhorn	4,190	13,750	Pennine Alps, Switzerland
Fremont Peak	4,189	13,743	Wind River Range, Wyoming, US
Mount Warren	4,182	13,720	Wind River Range, Wyoming, US
Mount Abbot	4,180	13,710	California, US
Dent d'Hérens	4,171	13,684	Pennine Alps, Switzerland
Mauna Loa	4,171	13,684	Hawaii, US
Jbel Toubkal	4,167	13,671	Atlas Mountains, Morocco
Mount Minto	4,165	13,665	Antarctica
Breithorn (Western Summit)	4,164	13,661	Pennine Alps, Switzerland/Italy
Jungfrau	4,158	13,642	Bernese Alps, Switzerland
Bishorn	4,153	13,625	Pennine Alps, Switzerland
Mount Helen	4,151	13,619	Wind River Range, Wyoming, US
El Mela	4,150	13,620	Andes, Argentina
Mount Quincy Adams	4,150	13,620	Fairweather Range, Canada/US
Doublet Peak	4,145	13,599	Wind River Range, Wyoming, US
Turret Peak	4,145	13,599	Wind River Range, Wyoming, US
Doña Juana	4,137	13,573	Nudo de los Pastos, Colombia
Mount Parnassus	4,137	13,573	Front Range, Rocky Mountains, Colorado, US
Mount Sacagawea	4,136	13,570	Wind River Range, Wyoming, US
Mount Dubois	4,135	13,566	White Mountains, California, US
Mount Muhabura	4,127	13,540	Virunga Mountains, Musanze, Rwanda
Kings Peak	4,125	13,533	Uinta Range, Utah, US
Aiguille Verte	4,122	13,524	Mont Blanc massif, France
Mount Bangeta	4,121	13,520	Papua New Guinea
Mount Dickerson	4,120	13,520	Queen Alexandra Range, Antarctica
Jackson Peak	4,120	13,520	Wind River Range, Wyoming, US
Cilo Dağı	4,116	13,504	Cilo Range, Eastern Taurus, Turkey
Mount Woodrow Wilson	4,115	13,501	Wind River Range, Wyoming, US
Aiguilles du Diable	4,114	13,497	Graian Alps, Mont Blanc massif, France
Bastion Peak	4,113	13,494	Wind River Range, Wyoming
Aiguille Blanche de Peuterey	4,112	13,491	Mont Blanc massif, Italy
Mönch	4,107	13,474	Bernese Alps, Switzerland
Chipeta Mountain	4,106	13,471	Sawatch Range, Colorado, US
Mount Febbas	4,105	13,468	Wind River Range, Wyoming, US
Barre des Écrins	4,102	13,458	Dauphiné Alps, France
Mount Aragats	4,095	13,435	Armenia
Mount Cameroon	4,095	13,435	Cameroon
Mount Kinabalu	4,095	13,435	Sabah, Malaysia – Highest in Malaysia
Grizzly Peak D	4,093	13,428	Front Range, Rocky Mountains, Colorado, US
Pollux	4,092	13,425	Pennine Alps, Switzerland
Mount Wade	4,085	13,402	Prince Olav Mountains, Antarctica
Nairamdal Peak	4,082	13,392	Altai Mountains, Mongolia
Mount Victoria	4,072	13,360	Papua New Guinea
Azufral	4,070	13,350	Nudo de los Pastos, Colombia
Centennial Peak	4,070	13,350	Prince Olav Mountains, Antarctica
Gran Paradiso	4,061	13,323	Graian Alps, Italy
Mount Süphan	4,058	13,314	Turkey
Ober Gabelhorn	4,053	13,297	Pennine Alps, Switzerland
Piz Bernina	4,049	13,284	Bernina Alps, Switzerland
Fiescherhorn	4,049	13,284	Bernese Alps, Switzerland
Grünhorn	4,043	13,264	Bernese Alps, Switzerland
Lauteraarhorn	4,042	13,261	Bernese Alps, Switzerland
Aiguille du Géant	4,035	13,238	Graian Alps, Mont Blanc massif, France
Mount Silverthrone	4,030	13,220	Alaska Range, Alaska, US
Mount Sniktau	4,034	13,235	Front Range, Rocky Mountains, Colorado, US
Fairview Peak	4,028	13,215	Sawatch Range, Colorado, US
Allalinhorn	4,027	13,212	Pennine Alps, Switzerland
Wind River Peak	4,021	13,192	Wind River Range, Wyoming, US
Latsga	4,019	13,186	Caucasus Mountains, Svaneti, Georgia
Weissmies	4,017	13,179	Pennine Alps, Switzerland
Mount Waddington	4,016	13,176	British Columbia, Canada
Mount Marcus Baker	4,016	13,176	Chugach Range, Alaska, US
Deavgay	4,016	13,176	Rutulsky District, Dagestan, Russia
Conejos Peak	4,015	13,173	San Juan Mountains, Colorado, US
Dent du Géant	4,013	13,166	Mont Blanc massif, France/Italy
Red Slate Mountain	4,013	13,166	Sierra Nevada, California, US
Cloud Peak	4,013	13,166	Big Horn Mountains, Wyoming, US
Wheeler Peak	4,012	13,163	Sangre de Cristo Mountains, New Mexico, US
Lagginhorn	4,010	13,160	Pennine Alps, Switzerland
Twilight Peak	4,010	13,160	San Juan Mountains, Colorado, US
Francs Peak	4,009	13,153	Absaroka Range, Wyoming, US
Mount Lahili	4,009	13,153	Svaneti Range, Svaneti, Georgia
Mount Walter	4,005	13,140	New Mexico, US
Les Droites	4,000	13,000	Mont Blanc massif, France

== 3,000 metres ==
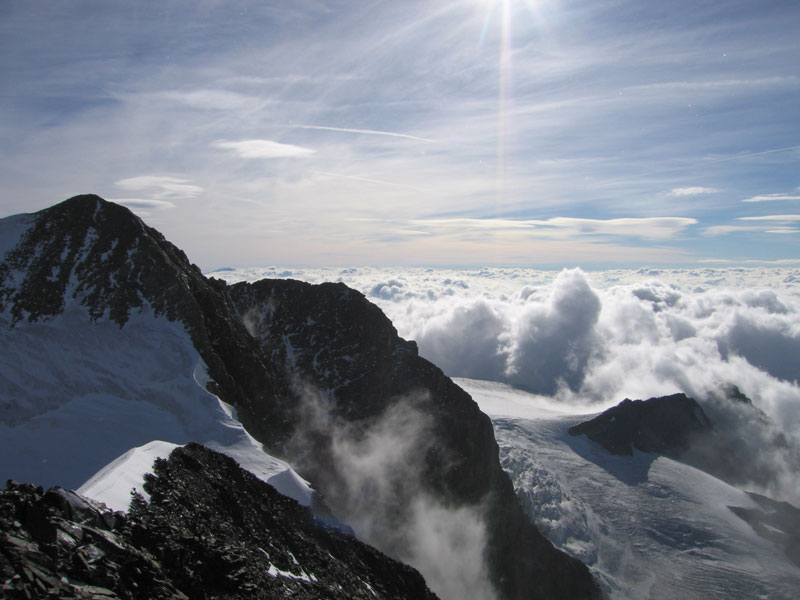
Piz Zupò – 3,995 m (13,107 ft)

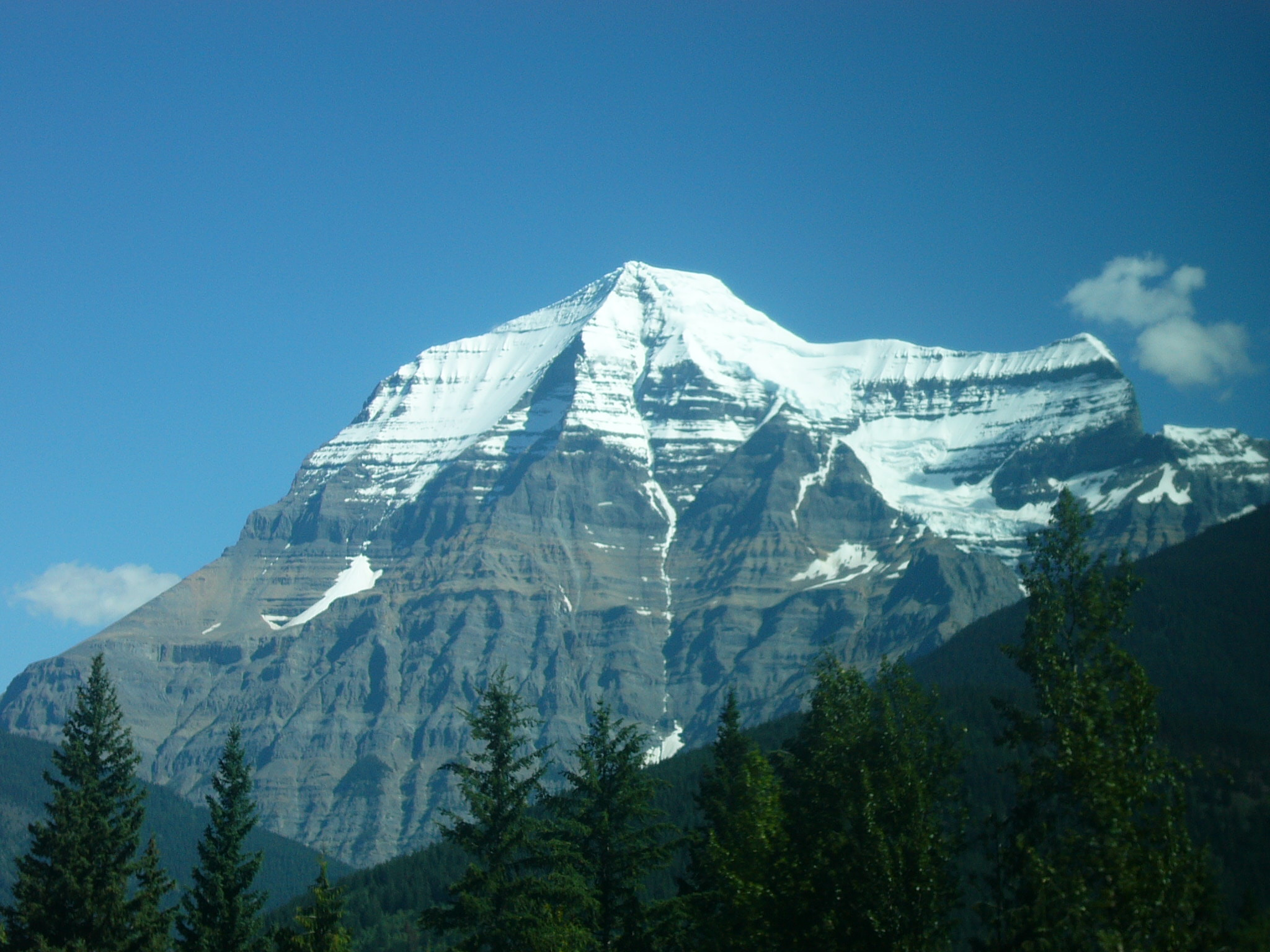
Mt. Robson – 3,954 m (12,972 ft)

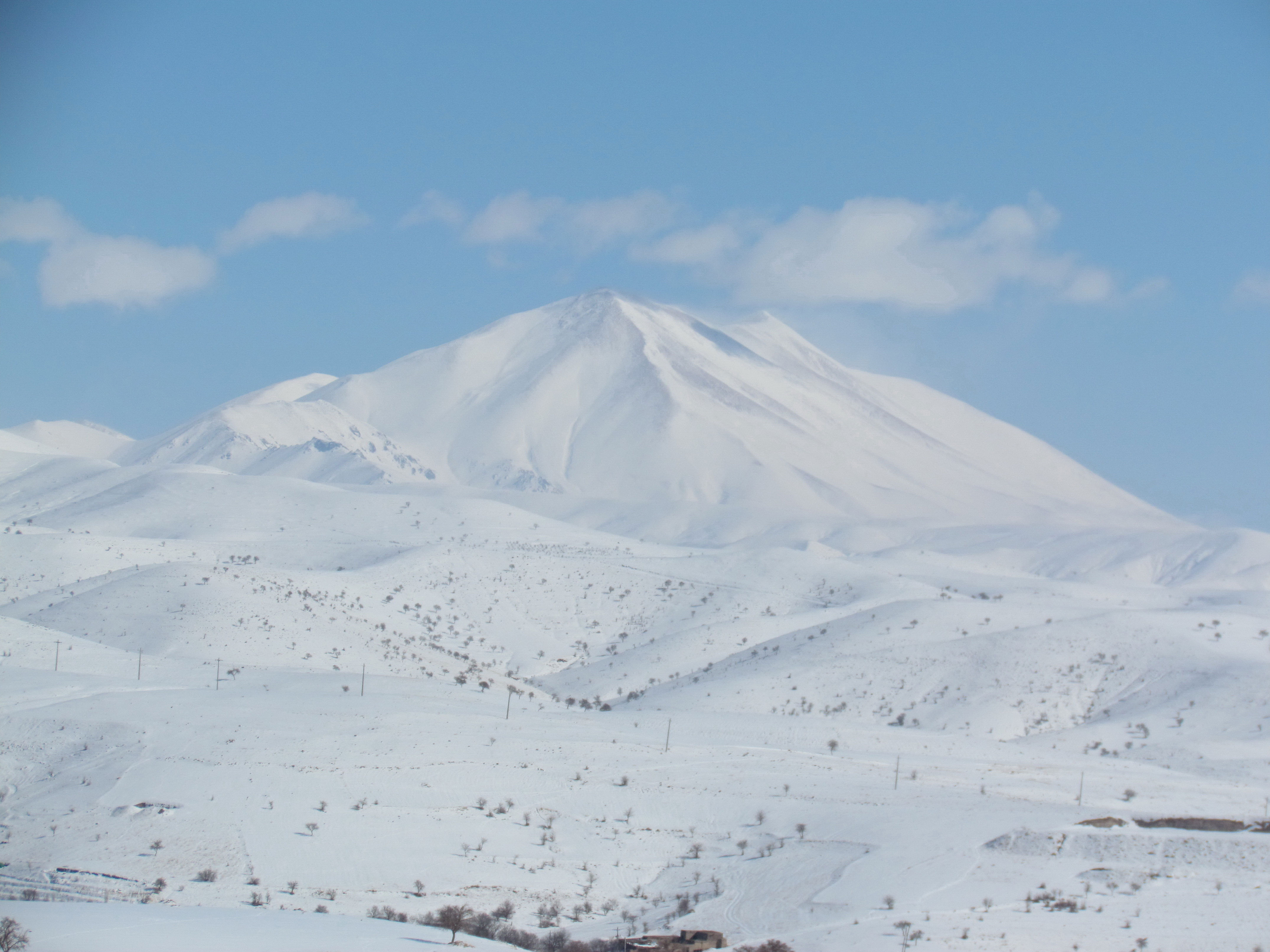
Mt. Sahand – 3,707 m (12,162 ft)

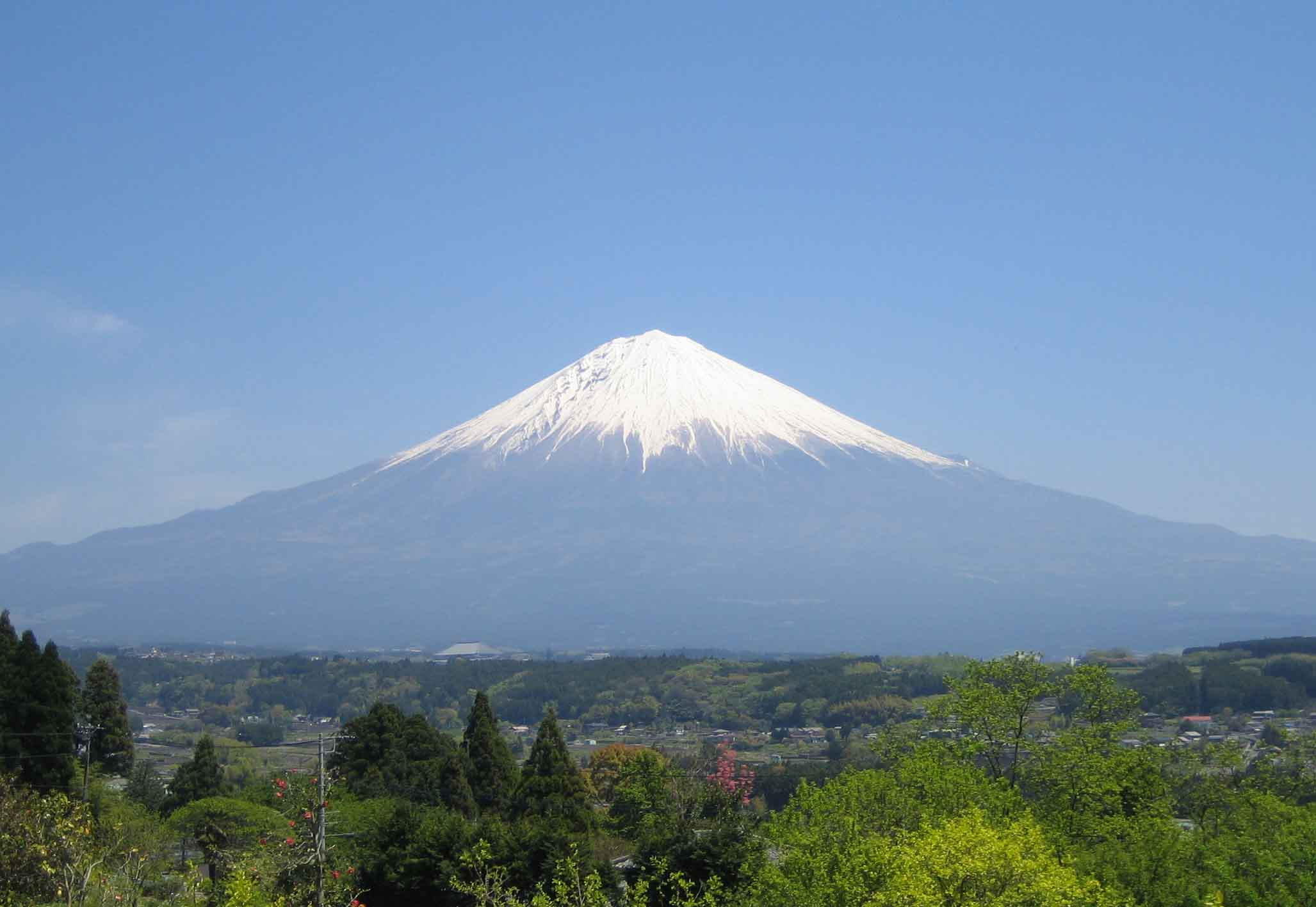
Mt. Fuji – 3,776 m (12,388 ft)

Mountain	Metres	Feet	Location and notes
Piz Zupò	3,995	13,107	Bernina Range, Switzerland
Truchas Peak	3,994	13,104	Sangre de Cristo Mountains, New Mexico
Fletschhorn	3,993	13,100	Pennine Alps, Switzerland
Mount Albert Edward	3,990	13,090	Papua New Guinea
La Meije	3,987	13,081	Dauphiné Alps, France
Wheeler Peak	3,982	13,064	Snake Range, Nevada
Mount Dana	3,981	13,061	California
Acatenango	3,976	13,045	Guatemala
Piz Roseg	3,973	13,035	Bernina Range, Switzerland
Piz Scerscen	3,971	13,028	Bernina Range, Switzerland
Eiger	3,967	13,015	Bernese Oberland, Switzerland
Mount Tochal	3,964	13,005	Alborz, Iran
Black Tooth Mountain	3,964	13,005	Bighorn Mountains, Wyoming
Grand Cornier	3,962	12,999	Pennine Alps, Switzerland
Mount Owen	3,957	12,982	Teton Range, Wyoming
Ailefroide	3,954	12,972	Dauphiné Alps, France
Mount Robson	3,954	12,972	Highest point in the Canadian Rockies
Descabezado Grande	3,953	12,969	Chile
Yu Shan (Mount Jade)	3,952	12,966	Highest point in Taiwan and East Asia
Mont Pelvoux	3,946	12,946	Dauphiné Alps, France
Mount Julian	3,940	12,930	Colorado, United States
Mount Khalatsa	3,938	12,920	Disputed, South Ossetia or Georgia
Mount Kaçkar	3,937	12,917	Black Sea Region, Turkey
Ajusco	3,930	12,890	Mexico
Little Ararat	3,925	12,877	Turkey
Mount Erciyes	3,916	12,848	Central Anatolia, Turkey
Bomber Mountain	3,914	12,841	Bighorn Range, Wyoming, United States
Pic Sans Nom	3,919	12,858	Dauphiné Alps, France
Ortler	3,905	12,812	Italy South Tyrol
Piz Palü	3,905	12,812	Bernina Range, Switzerland
Mount Kaputjugh	3,905	12,812	Armenia
Middle Teton	3,903	12,805	Teton Range, Wyoming
Aiguille d'Argentière	3,902	12,802	Mont Blanc massif, France/Switzerland
Granite Peak	3,901	12,799	Montana, US – Highest point
Mount Gibbs	3,893	12,772	Sierra Nevada, California, US
Mount Crillon	3,879	12,726	Fairweather Range, Alaska, US
Mont Blanc de Cheilon	3,870	12,700	Pennine Alps, Switzerland
Aiguille du Goûter	3,863	12,674	Graian Alps, Mont Blanc massif, France
Borah Peak	3,861	12,667	Idaho, US – Highest point
Grande Casse	3,855	12,648	Vanoise Massif, France
Humphreys Peak	3,852	12,638	Arizona, US – Highest point
Santa Fe Baldy	3,847	12,621	Sangre de Cristo Mountains, New Mexico
Mount Baldwin	3,845	12,615	Sierra Nevada, California, US
Aiguille du Midi	3,842	12,605	Graian Alps, Mont Blanc Massif, France
Mount Moran	3,842	12,605	Wyoming, US
Monte Viso	3,841	12,602	Italian Alps
Sauyr Zhotasy	3,840	12,600	Kazakhstan
Mount Saramati	3,826	12,552	Patkai Range, Highest in Nagaland, India
Nesthorn	3,822	12,539	Bernese Alps, Switzerland
Cerro Chirripó	3,820	12,530	Highest in Costa Rica
Aiguille des Glaciers	3,816	12,520	Mont Blanc massif, France/Italy
South Teton	3,814	12,513	Teton Range, Wyoming
Mount Kerinci	3,800	12,500	Highest volcano in Indonesia
Grossglockner	3,798	12,461	Austria – Highest point
Pigne d'Arolla	3,796	12,454	Pennine Alps, Switzerland
Mount Erebus	3,794	12,448	Antarctica – Southernmost active volcano
Mont Pourri	3,779	12,398	Vanoise Massif, France
Mount Fuji	3,776	12,388	Japan – Highest in Japan
Wildspitze	3,774	12,382	Austria
Greenhorn Mountain	3,763	12,346	Wet Mountains, Colorado, US
Volcán de Fuego	3,763	12,346	Guatemala
Mount Villard	3,760	12,340	Montana, US
Teewinot Mountain	3,757	12,326	Teton Range, Wyoming, US
Demirkazık Peak	3,756	12,323	Taurus Mountains, Turkey
Aiguille du Dru	3,754	12,316	Graian Alps, France
Aoraki / Mount Cook	3,754	12,316	New Zealand – Highest point in New Zealand
Pointe de Charbonnel	3,752	12,310	Graian Alps, France
Piz Morteratsch	3,751	12,306	Bernina Range, Switzerland
Sawtooth Mountain	3,750	12,300	Front Range, Colorado, US
Mount Davis	3,750	12,300	California, US
Mount Morrison	3,750	12,300	California, US
Mount Taibai	3,750	12,300	Qin Mountains, China – Highest point east of Tibetan massif
Aiguille de la Grande Sassière	3,747	12,293	Graian Alps, France
Lanín	3,747	12,293	Andes, Chile/Argentina
Mount Adams	3,743	12,280	Cascade Range, Washington, US
Mount Columbia	3,747	12,293	Canadian Rockies – Highest in Alberta
Mount Adams	3,743	12,280	Washington, US
Teepe Pillar	3,739	12,267	Teton Range, Wyoming, US
Weißkugel	3,739	12,267	Alps, Austria/Italy
Minarets	3,735	12,254	Sierra Nevada, California
Mount Huntington	3,731	12,241	Alaska Range, Alaska, US
Mount Rinjani	3,726	12,224	Indonesia
Asperity Mountain	3,723	12,215	Waddington Range
Cerro del Potosí	3,721	12,208	Mexico
Diamond Peak	3,719	12,201	Idaho, US
Teide	3,718	12,198	Canary Islands – Highest in Spain
Cerro de la Viga	3,712	12,178	Mexico
Delano Peak	3,711	12,175	Utah, US - Highest peak in the Tushar Mountains
Sahand	3,707	12,162	East Azerbaijan, Iran
Monte San Lorenzo	3,706	12,159	Patagonia, Argentina-Chile
Wetterhorn	3,701	12,142	Bernese Alps, Switzerland
Mount Valhalla	3,699	12,136	Alaska, US
Dent Parrachée	3,697	12,129	Vanoise Massif, France
Gunnbjørn	3,694	12,119	highest in Greenland
North Twin Peak	3,684	12,087	Canadian Rockies
Monte Disgrazia	3,678	12,067	Bregaglia, Switzerland
Semeru	3,676	12,060	Java, Indonesia
Les Bans	3,669	12,037	Ecrins, France
Cloudveil Dome	3,666	12,028	Teton Range, Wyoming, US
Thor Peak	3,666	12,028	Teton Range, Wyoming, United States
Medicine Bow Peak	3,661	12,011	Wyoming, US
Hyndman Peak	3,660	12,010	Idaho, US
Mount Clemenceau	3,658	12,001	Canadian Rockies
Mount Frakes	3,654	11,988	Crary Mountains, Antarctica
Grande Motte	3,653	11,985	Vanoise Massif, France
Sierra Blanca	3,652	11,982	Sacramento Mountains, New Mexico
Pointe de la Fournache	3,642	11,949	Vanoise Massif, France
Buck Mountain	3,639	11,939	Teton Range, Wyoming
Mount Nebo	3,636	11,929	Utah, US
Mount Charleston	3,632	11,916	Nevada, US
Hintere Schwärze	3,628	11,903	Ötztal Alps, Austria/Italy
Nez Perce Peak	3,627	11,900	Teton Range, Wyoming, US
Mount Alberta	3,619	11,873	Canadian Rockies
Mount Assiniboine	3,618	11,870	Canadian Rockies
Tödi	3,614	11,857	Swiss Alps
Mount Forbes	3,612	11,850	Canadian Rockies
Lautaro	3,607	11,834	Patagonia, Chile
Dôme de la Sache	3,601	11,814	Vanoise Massif, France
Castle Peak	3,601	11,814	Idaho, US
Dôme de l'Arpont	3,601	11,814	Vanoise Massif, France
Dôme de Chasseforêt	3,586	11,765	Vanoise Massif, France
Makra Peak	3,586	11,765	Pakistan
Sierra Velluda	3,585	11,762	Chile
Grand Roc Noir	3,582	11,752	Vanoise Massif, France
Mount Timpanogos	3,582	11,752	Utah, United States
Mount Alvand	3,580	11,750	Hamedan, Iran
Dôme des Nants	3,570	11,710	Vanoise Massif, France
Ryan Peak	3,570	11,710	Idaho, US
South Twin Peak	3,566	11,699	Canadian Rockies
Olan	3,564	11,693	Ecrins, France
Aiguille de Péclet	3,561	11,683	Vanoise Massif, France
Presanella	3,558	11,673	Adamello-Presanella, Italy
Mount Steere	3,558	11,673	Antarctica
Monarch Mountain	3,555	11,663	Pacific Ranges, British Columbia, Canada
Monte Leone	3,552	11,654	Lepontine Alps, Switzerland
Mount Artos	3,550	11,650	Turkey
Mont Turia	3,550	11,650	Vanoise Massif, France
Mount Temple	3,543	11,624	Canadian Rockies
Disappointment Peak	3,541	11,617	Teton Range, Wyoming
Mount Adamello	3,539	11,611	Adamello-Presanella, Italy
Mount Woodring	3,533	11,591	Teton Range, Wyoming
Aiguille de Polset	3,531	11,585	Vanoise Massif, France
Mount Medetsiz	3,524	11,562	Taurus Mountains, Turkey
Snow Dome	3,520	11,550	Canadian Rockies
Aiguilles d'Arves	3,515	11,532	Arve Massif, France
Mount Tendürek	3,514	11,529	Turkey
Mount Ellen (Utah)	3,513	11,526	Henry Mountains, Utah, US – Last surveyed mountain range in US lower 48 states
Mont de Gébroulaz	3,511	11,519	Vanoise Massif, France
Mount San Gorgonio	3,505	11,499	California, US
Mount Kitchener	3,505	11,499	Canadian Rockies
Zuckerhütl	3,505	11,499	Stubai Alps, Austria
Mount Wister	3,502	11,490	Teton Range, Wyoming
Mount Saskatchewan	3,500	11,500	Yukon, Canada
Mount Tasman	3,497	11,473	Southern Alps, New Zealand
Mount Hungabee	3,492	11,457	Canadian Rockies
Mount Athabasca	3,491	11,453	Canadian Rockies
Tronador	3,491	11,453	Chile/Argentina
Mount Saint John	3,484	11,430	Teton Range, Wyoming
Thabana Ntlenyana	3,482	11,424	Drakensberg, Africa
Pointes du Châtelard	3,479	11,414	Vanoise Massif, France
Mulhacén	3,479	11,414	Spain – Highest in continental Spain
Mount Berlin	3,478	11,411	Flood Range, Antarctica
Mount Pennell	3,478	11,411	Henry Mountains, Utah, US.
Volcán Barú	3,475	11,401	Chiriquí, Panama
Roc des Saints Pères	3,470	11,380	Vanoise Massif, France
Mount Brazeau	3,470	11,380	Canadian Rockies
Mount Nyiragongo	3,470	11,380	Virunga Mountains, DRC
Ruby Dome	3,470	11,380	Ruby Mountains, Nevada
Roche de la Muzelle	3,465	11,368	Dauphine Alps, France
Mount Victoria	3,464	11,365	Canadian Rockies
Abajo Peak	3,463	11,362	Abajo Mountains, Utah
Eagle Peak	3,462	11,358	Absaroka Range, Wyoming, United States
Doane Peak	3,461	11,355	Teton Range, Wyoming, US
Ranger Peak	3,461	11,355	Teton range, Wyoming, US
Mount Takahe	3,460	11,350	Antarctica
Cerro de la Muerte	3,451	11,322	Second highest in Costa Rica
Furgghorn	3,451	11,322	Pennine Alps, Switzerland
Mafadi	3,450	11,320	Drakensberg, South Africa
Mount Andromeda	3,450	11,320	Canadian Rockies
Boulder Mountain	3,449	11,316	Utah, US. Highest timbered plateau in N America
Mount Joffre	3,449	11,316	Canadian Rockies
Hilgard Peak	3,449	11,316	Madison Range, Montana, US
Mount Taylor (New Mexico)	3,446	11,306	San Mateo Mountains, New Mexico, US
Static Peak	3,445	11,302	Teton Range, Wyoming, US
Thousand Lake Mountain	3,444	11,299	Utah, US
Pointe de la Sana	3,436	11,273	Vanoise Massif, France
Eagles Rest Peak	3,431	11,257	Teton Range, Wyoming, US
Irazú Volcano	3,431	11,257	Costa Rica
Mount Hood	3,429	11,250	Cascade Range, Oregon, US
Verpeilspitze	3,425	11,237	Austria
Deltaform Mountain	3,424	11,234	Canadian Rockies
Mount Lefroy	3,423	11,230	Canadian Rockies
Pointe de l'Échelle	3,422	11,227	Vanoise Massif, France
Pointe du Bouchet	3,420	11,220	Vanoise Massif, France
Mount Fitzgerald	3,418	11,214	Ruby Mountains, Nevada, US
Bellecôte	3,417	11,211	Vanoise Massif, France
Crazy Peak	3,417	11,211	Montana, US
Emi Koussi	3,415	11,204	Tibesti Mountains, Chad
Piz Linard	3,410	11,190	Switzerland
Mount Woolley	3,405	11,171	Canadian Rockies
Aneto	3,404	11,168	Pyrenees, Spain – Highest in Pyrenees
Lone Mountain	3,404	11,168	Madison Range, Montana, US
Fluchthorn	3,399	11,152	Silvretta, Austria-Switzerland
Grand Bec	3,398	11,148	Vanoise Massif, France
Rockchuck Peak	3,397	11,145	Teton Range, Wyoming
Pico Veleta	3,396	11,142	Sierra Nevada, Spain – Location of the highest road in Europe
Mount Hector	3,394	11,135	Canadian Rockies
Piz Platta	3,392	11,129	Swiss Alps
Telescope Peak	3,392	11,129	Death Valley
Champagne Castle	3,377	11,079	Drakensberg, South Africa
Cerro Chaltén	3,375	11,073	Patagonia, Argentina-Chile
Mount Spurr	3,374	11,070	Alaska
Pointe du Vallonnet	3,372	11,063	Vanoise Massif, France
Mammoth Mountain	3,371	11,060	California
Fründenhorn	3,369	11,053	Bernese Alps, Switzerland
Pointe Renod	3,368	11,050	Vanoise Massif, France
Traverse Peak	3,368	11,050	Teton Range, Wyoming
Mount Edith Cavell	3,363	11,033	Canadian Rockies
Dôme des Sonnailles	3,361	11,027	Vanoise Massif, France
Valvelspitze	3,360	11,020	Austria
Mount Etna	3,357	11,014	Metropolitan City of Catania, Italy
Mount Agepsta	3,357	11,014	Gagra Range, Abkhazia, Georgia
Mount Munday	3,356	11,010	Pacific Ranges, B.C., Canada
Pointe de Claret	3,355	11,007	Vanoise Massif, France
Monte Perdido	3,355	11,007	Pyrenees
Electric Peak	3,343	10,968	Gallatin Range, Montana
Marmolada	3,343	10,968	Dolomites, Italy – Highest mountain of the Dolomites
Mount Saskatchewan	3,342	10,965	Canadian Rockies
Cerro Fábrega	3,335	10,942	Bocas Del Toro, Panama
Ward Mountain	3,333	10,935	Nevada, US
Pointe de Méan Martin	3,330	10,930	Vanoise Massif, France
Dôme de Polset	3,326	10,912	Vanoise Massif, France
Cathedral Peak	3,326	10,912	California, US
Raynolds Peak	3,325	10,909	Teton Range, Wyoming
Rolling Thunder Mountain	3,324	10,906	Teton Range, Wyoming
Mount Hampton	3,323	10,902	Antarctica
Dôme des Pichères	3,319	10,889	Vanoise Massif, France
Grand Roc	3,316	10,879	Vanoise Massif, France
Giant's Castle	3,315	10,876	Drakensberg, South Africa
Sunwapta Peak	3,315	10,876	Canadian Rockies
Piz Buin	3,312	10,866	Silvretta, Austria-Switzerland
Mount Ball	3,311	10,863	Canadian Rockies
Piz Badile	3,308	10,853	Bregaglia, Switzerland
Ağ Dağ	3,306	10,846	Bozgush mountain range, East Azerbaijan, Iran
San Jacinto Peak	3,302	10,833	California, US
Didi Abuli	3,301	10,830	Georgia
Silberhorn	3,300	10,800	Southern Alps, New Zealand
Bivouac Peak	3,299	10,823	Teton Range, Wyoming
Mount Wilbur	3,298	10,820	Fairweather Range, Alaska, US
Monte Argentera	3,297	10,817	Maritime Alps, Italy
Mount Rose (Nevada)	3,287	10,784	Carson Range, Nevada
Mount Samsari	3,285	10,778	Abul-Samsari Range, Georgia
Roche Chevrière	3,281	10,764	Vanoise Massif, France
Habicht	3,277	10,751	Stubai Alps, Austria
Thompson Peak	3,277	10,751	Idaho, US
Palandöken Mountain	3,271	10,732	Turkey
Mount Chephren	3,266	10,715	Canadian Rockies
Pointe de Thorens	3,266	10,715	Vanoise Massif, France
Mount Cramer	3,266	10,715	Idaho, US
Toussidé	3,265	10,712	Tibesti Mountains, Chad-Libya
Antelao	3,264	10,709	Dolomites, Italy
Mont Pelve	3,261	10,699	Vanoise Massif, France
Mount Stanley Baldwin	3,256	10,682	Columbia Mountains, B.C., Canada
Sandia Crest	3,255	10,679	New Mexico, US
Épaule du Bouchet	3,250	10,660	Vanoise Massif, France
Mount Smythe	3,246	10,650	Canadian Rockies
Wildstrubel	3,243	10,640	Bernese Alps, Switzerland
Williams Peak	3,242	10,636	Idaho, US
Mount Hope	3,239	10,627	Highest British mountain, British Antarctic Territory
Titlis	3,238	10,623	Bernese Alps, Switzerland
Owl Peak	3,235	10,614	Teton Range, Wyoming
Mount Mackenzie King	3,234	10,610	Cariboo Mountains, B.C., Canada
Pointe des Buffettes	3,233	10,607	Vanoise Massif, France
Lisenser Spitze	3,230	10,600	Stubai Alps, Austria
Mount Terror	3,230	10,600	Antarctica
Aiguille Rouge	3,227	10,587	Vanoise Massif, France
Monte Civetta	3,220	10,560	Dolomites, Italy
Symmetry Spire	3,219	10,561	Teton Range, Wyoming
Akdağ	3,213	10,541	Taurus Mountains, Turkey
Glacier Peak	3,213	10,541	Washington, US
Pointe du Dard	3,212	10,538	Vanoise Massif, France
Mount Binalud	3,211	10,535	Alborz, Iran
Pointe de la Réchasse	3,206	10,518	Vanoise Massif, France
Mount Jefferson	3,204	10,512	Montana, US
Mount Jefferson	3,199	10,495	Cascade Range, Oregon, US
Dreiländerspitze	3,197	10,489	Silvretta, Austria-Switzerland
Mount Kita	3,193	10,476	Akaishi Mountains, Japan
Mount Hotaka	3,190	10,470	Hida Mountains, Japan
Mount Cleveland	3,190	10,470	Montana, US
Ainodake	3,189	10,463	Akaishi Mountains, Japan
Lassen Peak	3,189	10,463	California, US
Mount Galatea	3,185	10,449	Kananaskis Range, Alberta, Canada
Mount Kinyeti	3,187	10,456	Eastern Equatoria, South Sudan
Rendezvous Mountain	3,185	10,449	Teton Range, Wyoming, US
Saviers Peak	3,182	10,440	Idaho, US
Mount Yari	3,180	10,430	Hida Mountains, Japan
Kendrick Peak	3,178	10,427	San Francisco Peaks, USA
Kendrick Peak	3,178	10,427	San Francisco Peaks, USA
Parícutin	3,170	10,400	Mexico
Mount Aylmer	3,162	10,374	Canadian Rockies
South Sister	3,157	10,358	Cascade Range, Oregon, US
Stanley Peak	3,155	10,351	Ball Range, Canadian Rockies
Jøkulkyrkja	3,148	10,328	Antarctica
Pica d'Estats	3,143	10,312	Spanish–French border, Pyrenees
Phan Xi Păng	3,143	10,312	Sa pa, Vietnam
Mount Arakawa	3,141	10,305	Akaishi Mountains, Japan
Gray Peak	3,140	10,300	Yellowstone National Park, Wyoming, US
Mount Heyburn	3,139	10,299	Idaho, US
Mount Washburn	3,122	10,243	Yellowstone National Park, Wyoming, US
Mount Collie	3,116	10,223	Canadian Rockies
Mount Siple	3,110	10,200	Antarctica
Pirchinassi	3,110	10,200	Muzaffarabad Azad Kashmir
Mount Redoubt	3,108	10,197	Alaska, US
Mount Babel	3,101	10,174	Bow Range, Alberta, Canada
Mount Emei	3,099	10,167	China
Pico Duarte	3,098	10,164	Dominican Republic
Picacho del Diablo	3,096	10,157	Baja California, Mexico
Trapper Peak	3,096	10,157	Montana, US
Storm Mountain	3,095	10,154	Canadian Rockies
Mount Blackmore	3,094	10,151	Montana, US
Mount Stimson	3,091	10,141	Montana, US
Mol Len	3,088	10,131	Patkai Range, Nagaland-India/Burma<http://www.peaklist.org/WWlists/ultras/burma.html>
Qurnat as Sawdā’	3,088	10,131	Lebanon
Mount Richardson	3,086	10,125	Canadian Rockies
Kintla Peak	3,079	10,102	Livingston Range, Montana, US
Mount Moulton	3,078	10,098	Antarctica
Smoky Dome	3,077	10,095	Idaho, US
North Sister	3,074	10,085	Cascade Range, Oregon, US
Nat Ma Taung	3,070	10,070	Myanmar
Piton des Neiges	3,069	10,069	Réunion, France
Mount San Antonio	3,068	10,066	San Gabriel Mountains, California, US
Mount Ontake	3,067	10,062	Japan
Mount Jackson	3,064	10,052	Lewis Range, Montana, US
Middle Sister	3,062	10,046	Cascade Range, Oregon, US
Mount Wutai	3,061	10,043	Shanxi, China
Mount Nyamuragira	3,058	10,033	Democratic Republic of the Congo
Haleakala	3,057	10,030	Hawaii, US
Crowfoot Mountain	3,055	10,023	Canadian Rockies
Mount Chester	3,054	10,020	Canadian Rockies
Mount Siyeh	3,052	10,013	Montana, US
Mount Merritt	3,049	10,003	Montana, US
Cerro de Coxóm	3,045	9,990	Guatemala
Parseierspitze	3,036	9,961	Austria
Mount Senjō	3,033	9,951	Akaishi Mountains, Japan
Mount Aspiring/Tititea	3,033	9,951	New Zealand
Kinnerly Peak	3,031	9,944	Montana, US
Mount Agung	3,031	9,944	Bali, Indonesia
Mount McArthur	3,021	9,911	Canadian Rockies
Mount Norikura	3,026	9,928	Hida Mountains, Japan
Tsiteli Khati	3,026	9,928	Kharuli Range, Georgia
Mount Tate	3,015	9,892	Hida Mountains, Japan
Cathedral Peak	3,004	9,856	Drakensberg
Mount Tahat	3,003	9,852	Algeria – Highest
Sapitwa	3,002	9,849	Mulanje Massif, Malawi
Ben Macdhui	3,001	9,846	Eastern Cape, South Africa
The Fortress	3,000	9,800	Canadian Rockies

== 2,000 metres ==
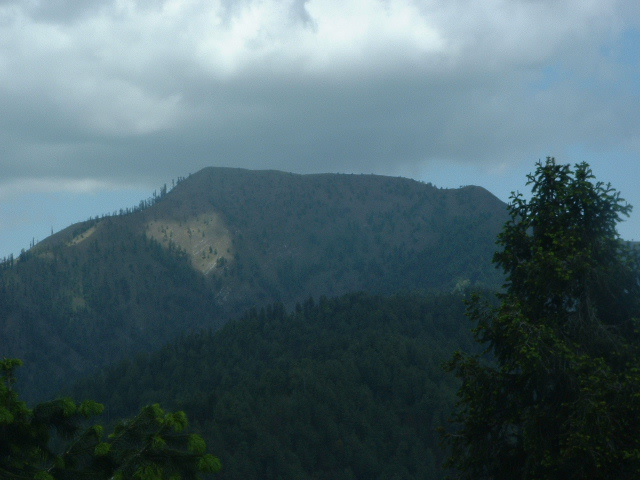
Miranjani – 2,980 m (9,777 ft)

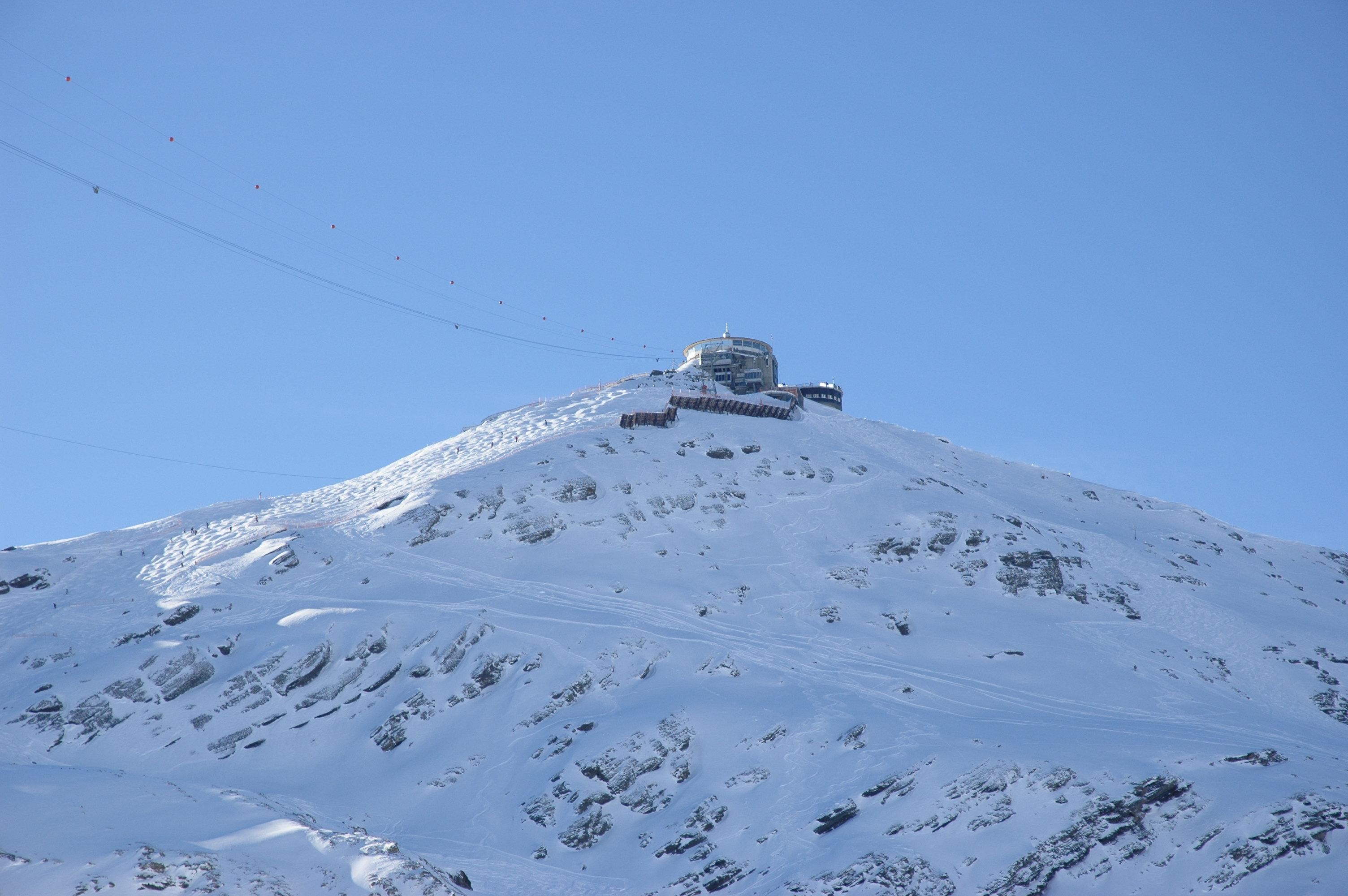
Schilthorn – 2,970 m (9,744 ft)

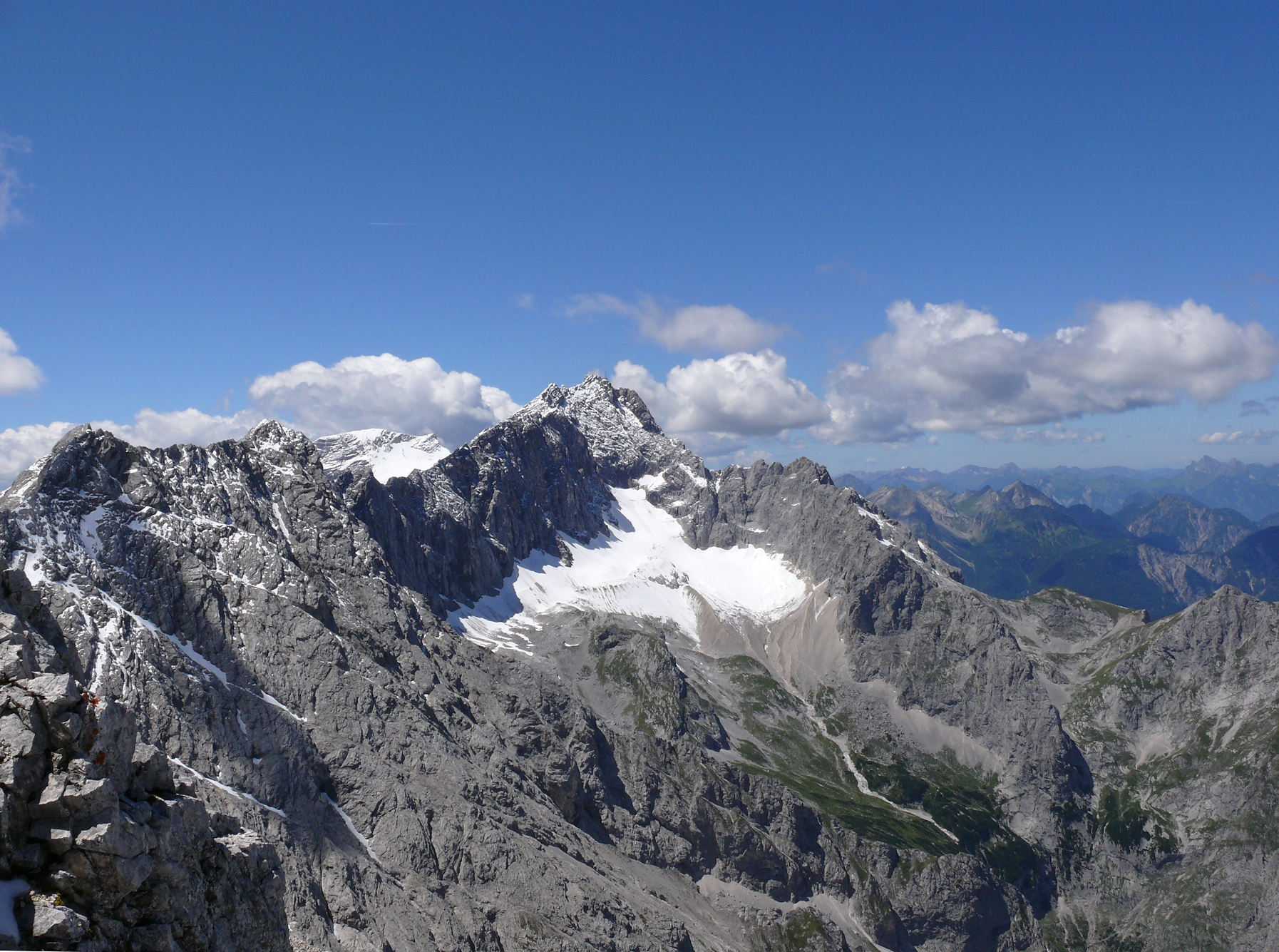
Zugspitze – 2,962 m (9,718 ft)

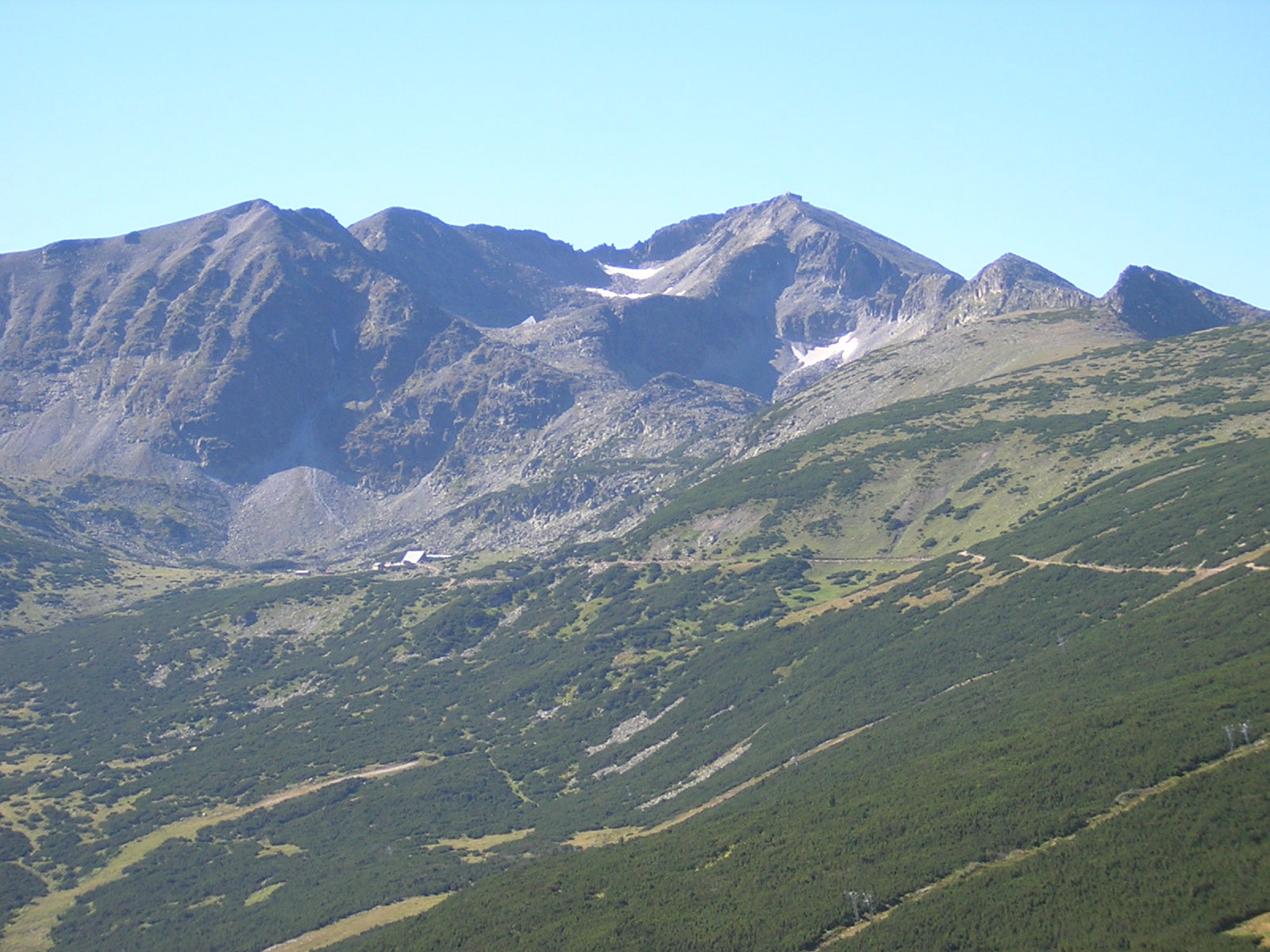
Musala – 2,925 m (9,596 ft)

Mountain	Metres	Feet	Location and notes
Tre Cime di Lavaredo	2,999	9,839	Province of Belluno, Italy
Pizzo Centrale	2,999	9,839	Switzerland
Cascade Mountain	2,998	9,836	Vermilion Range, Canadian Rockies, Canada
Copahue	2,997	9,833	Andes, Argentina/Chile
Mount Girouard	2,995	9,826	Fairholme Range, Canadian Rockies, Canada
Mount Iso	2,994	9,823	near Mao, Highest in Manipur, India
Pico da Neblina	2,994	9,823	Serra do Imeri, Amazonas, Brazil – Highest
Mount Whyte	2,983	9,787	Bow Range, Canadian Rockies, Canada
Miranjani	2,980	9,780	Pakistan
Forellen Peak	2,979	9,774	Teton Range, Wyoming, US
Mount Andrus	2,978	9,770	Ames Range, Antarctica
Mount Niblock	2,976	9,764	Bow Range, Canadian Rockies, Canada
Pico 31 de Março	2,973	9,754	Serra do Imeri, Amazonas, Brazil
Keele Peak	2,972	9,751	Mackenzie Mountains, Yukon, Canada
Mount Odin	2,970	9,740	Monashee Mountains, B.C., Canada
Schilthorn	2,970	9,740	Bernese Alps, Switzerland
Mount Tallac	2,968	9,738	Sierra Nevada, California, US
Mount Merapi	2,968	9,738	Java, Indonesia
Steens Mountain	2,968	9,738	Isolated peak in Southeastern Oregon
Mount Inglismaldie	2,964	9,724	Fairholme Range, Canadian Rockies, Canada
Mount Ramelau	2,963	9,721	Highest in East Timor
Zugspitze	2,962	9,718	Germany – Highest
Slide Mountain (Nevada)	2,957	9,701	Carson Range, Nevada
Little Alberta	2,956	9,698	Sir Winston Churchill Range, Canadian Rockies, Canada
Mount Arfak	2,955	9,695	Arfak Mountains, West Papua, Indonesia
Iron Mountain	2,955	9,695	Soldier Mountains, Idaho, US
Apo	2,954	9,692	Philippines – Highest
Fossil Mountain	2,946	9,665	Banff NP, Alberta, Canada
Coma Pedrosa	2,942	9,652	Pyrenees, Andorra – Highest
Going to the Sun Mountain	2,939	9,642	Lewis Range, Montana, US
Fishers Peak	2,936	9,633	Raton Mesas, Colorado-New Mexico, US
Pilot Mountain	2,935	9,629	Massive Range, Canadian Rockies, Canada
Uri Rotstock	2,928	9,606	Switzerland
Musala	2,925	9,596	Rila Mountain, Bulgaria – Highest
Mount Pulag	2,926	9,600	Philippines
Mount Olympus	2,917	9,570	Thessaly/Macedonia, Greece – Highest
Vihren	2,914	9,560	Pirin Mountain, Bulgaria
Mount Gould	2,912	9,554	Montana, US
Corno Grande	2,912	9,554	Abruzzo, Italy
Mount Blakiston	2,910	9,550	Flathead Range, Canadian Rockies, Canada
Puigmal	2,909	9,544	Spanish–French border, Pyrenees
Kutelo	2,908	9,541	Pirin Mountain, Bulgaria
Chutine Peak	2,903	9,524	Coast Range, British Columbia, Canada
Malka Musala	2,902	9,521	Rila Mountain, Bulgaria
Rising Wolf Mountain	2,900	9,500	Lewis Range, Montana, US
Bonanza Peak	2,899	9,511	Cascade Range, Washington, US
Mount McLoughlin	2,894	9,495	Mount McLoughlin, Oregon, US
Pic de Sanfonts	2,894	9,495	Pyrenees, Andorra
Pico da Bandeira	2,892	9,488	Serra do Caparaó, Minas Gerais/Espírito Santo, Brazil
Collarada	2,886	9,469	Pyrenees, Spain
Banski Suhodol	2,884	9,462	Pirin Mountain, Bulgaria
Boardman Peak	2,882	9,455	Soldier Mountains, Idaho, US
Mount Wrightson	2,882	9,455	Santa Rita Mountains, Arizona, US
Lembert Dome	2,880	9,450	California, US
Sacajawea Peak	2,876	9,436	Wallowa Mountains, Oregon, US
Mount Stuart	2,869	9,413	Cascades, Washington, US
Mount Fisht	2,867	9,406	Adygea, Russia
Silverthrone Mountain	2,865	9,400	British Columbia, Canada
Mount Baden-Powell	2,864.75	9,398.8	San Gabriel Mountain, California, US
Triglav	2,864	9,396	Slovenia – Highest
Mount Saint Nicholas	2,858	9,377	Montana, US
Irechek	2,852	9,357	Rila Mountain, Bulgaria
Polezhan	2,851	9,354	Pirin Mountain, Bulgaria
Mount Tabayoc	2,842	9,324	Cordillera Range, Benguet, Philippines
Mount Wilbur	2,841	9,321	Montana, US
Pico do Fogo	2,829	9,281	Cape Verde – Highest
Kamenitsa	2,822	9,259	Pirin Mountain, Bulgaria
Mount Fernow	2,819	9,249	Washington, US
Mount Hermon	2,814	9,232	Syria and Lebanon; a subpeak on its southern slopes is within the Israeli-occupied Golan Heights region
Mount Deakin	2,810	9,220	Antarctica
Mount Cory	2,802	9,193	Alberta, Canada
Mount Thielsen	2,799	9,183	Cascades, Oregon, US
Pedra da Mina	2,798	9,180	Serra da Mantiqueira, Minas Gerais/São Paulo, Brazil
Mount Ruapehu	2,797	9,177	Tongariro National Park, North Island, New Zealand – Highest in the North Island
Copper Mountain	2,795	9,170	Alberta, Canada
Mount Lemmon	2,795	9,170	Santa Catalina Mountains, Arizona, US
Maiella	2,793	9,163	Abruzzo, Italy
Pico das Agulhas Negras	2,792	9,160	Serra do Itatiaia, Minas Gerais/Rio de Janeiro, Brazil
Deno	2,790	9,150	Rila Mountain, Bulgaria
Hayes Volcano	2,788	9,147	Alaska, US
Mount Edziza	2,787	9,144	British Columbia, Canada
Canigó	2,784	9,134	Pyrenees, France
Mount Weaver	2,780	9,120	Antarctica
Buckner Mountain	2,778	9,114	Washington, US
Mount Longonot	2,776	9,108	Great Rift Valley, Kenya
Seven Fingered Jack	2,774	9,101	Washington, US
Mount Nirvana	2,773	9,098	Northwest Territories, Canada
Chief Mountain	2,768	9,081	Montana, US
Lincoln Peak	2,768	9,081	Washington, US
Castle Mountain	2,766	9,075	Canadian Rockies, Canada
Pyramid Mountain	2,766	9,075	Canadian Rockies, Canada
Pico Naiguata (Avila)	2,765	9,072	Caracas, Venezuela
Mount Bachelor	2,764	9,068	Formerly Bachelor Butte, Cascade Mountains, Oregon, US
Mount Korab	2,764	9,068	North Macedonia & Albania – Highest
Yalovarnika	2,763	9,065	Pirin Mountain, Bulgaria
Gazey	2,761	9,058	Pirin Mountain, Bulgaria
Mount Sir James MacBrien	2,759	9,052	Canada
Kaymakchal	2,753	9,032	Pirin Mountain, Bulgaria
Mount Olympus	2,751	9,026	Utah, US
Todorka	2,746	9,009	Pirin Mountain, Bulgaria
Mawson Peak	2,745	9,006	Heard Island and McDonald Islands, Australia – Highest in Australia
Fairview Mountain	2,744	9,003	Bow Range, Canadian Rockies, Canada
Mount Baekdu	2,744	9,003	North Korea/China Highest in North Korea
Škrlatica	2,740	8,990	Julian Alps, Slovenia
Monte Roraima	2,739	8,986	Serra de Pacaraima, Roraima, Brazil
Heavens Peak	2,739	8,986	Montana, US
Mount Spickard	2,737	8,980	North Cascades, US
Banderishki Chukar	2,732	8,963	Pirin Mountain, Bulgaria
Mount Melbourne	2,732	8,963	Antarctica
Cerro El Pital	2,730	8,960	El Salvador – Highest
Mount Redoubt	2,730	8,960	Washington, US
Dzhengal	2,730	8,960	Pirin Mountain, Bulgaria
Malyovitsa	2,729	8,953	Rila Mountain, Bulgaria
Pizzo di Claro	2,727	8,947	Ticino, Switzerland
Mount Morning	2,723	8,934	Antarctica
Phu Xai Lai Leng	2,720	8,920	Laos
Serles	2,718	8,917	Stubai Alps, Austria
Watzmann	2,713	8,901	Bavarian Alps, Germany
Boston Peak	2,711	8,894	Washington, US
Schiahorn	2,709	8,888	Switzerland
Grotto Mountain	2,706	8,878	Canadian Rockies, Canada
Kennedy Peak (Myanmar)	2,703	8,868	Myanmar
Mount Haku	2,702	8,865	Ryōhaku Mountains, Japan
Eldorado Peak	2,701	8,862	Washington, US
Anaimudi	2,695	8,842	Kerala, India – Highest in Western Ghats, India
Maja Jezerce	2,694	8,839	Highest in Dinaric Alps, Albania
Half Dome	2,693	8,835	Sierra Nevada, California, US
Mount Louis	2,682	8,799	Alberta, Canada
Mount Discovery	2,681	8,796	Antarctica
Pic de la Selle	2,680	8,790	Haiti
Mount Garibaldi	2,678	8,786	British Columbia, Canada
Bashliyski Chukar	2,670	8,760	Pirin Mountain, Bulgaria
Pedra do Sino	2,670	8,760	Serra dos Órgãos, Rio de Janeiro, Brazil
Guadalupe Peak	2,667	8,750	Guadalupe Mountains, Texas – Highest in Texas
Gjeravica	2,656	8,714	Accursed Mountains, Kosovo – Highest in Kosovo
Großer Krottenkopf	2,656	8,714	Allgäu Alps, Tyrol, Austria
Pic del Port Vell	2,655	8,711	Pyrenees, Andorra
Gerlachov Peak	2,655	8,711	High Tatras, Slovakia
Mount Michelson	2,652	8,701	Chugach Mountains, Alaska, US
Torre Cerredo	2,650	8,690	Picos de Europa, Spain – Highest in Picos de Europa
Mount St. Piran	2,649	8,691	Bow Range, Alberta, Canada
Mount Meager	2,645	8,678	British Columbia, Canada
Mount Trus Madi	2,642	8,668	Trus Madi Range, Sabah, Malaysia – No. 2 in Malaysia
Meesapulimala	2,640	8,660	Tamil Nadu/Kerala, India
Doddabetta	2,637	8,652	Tamil Nadu, India
Piton de la Fournaise	2,631	8,632	Réunion
Mount Crean	2,630	8,630	Victoria Land
Cardinal Peak	2,618	8,589	Washington, US
Barbeau Peak	2,616	8,583	Nunavut, Canada – Highest in Nunavut
Monte Legnone	2,609	8,560	Province of Lecco, Lombardy, Italy
Pelister Peak	2,601	8,533	North Macedonia
Mount Abao	2,596	8,517	Philippines
Pico Almanzor	2,592	8,504	Spain
Mount Currie	2,591	8,501	BC, Canada
Pizzo Molare	2,585	8,481	Ticino, Switzerland
Mount Tavkvetili	2,583	8,474	Georgia
Mount Tambuyukon	2,579	8,461	Sabah, Malaysia
Argonaut Peak	2,576	8,451	Washington, US
Doi Inthanon	2,565	8,415	Thailand – Highest in Thailand
Pic dels Aspres	2,562	8,406	Pyrenees, Andorra
Ledyanaya	2,562	8,406	Russia – Highest of the Koryak Mountains
Aguja Saint Exupery	2,558	8,392	Argentina
Mount St. Helens	2,550	8,370	Washington, US
Big Hatchet Peak	2,547	8,356	New Mexico, US
Moldoveanu Peak	2,544	8,346	Romania
Uludağ	2,543	8,343	Turkey
Mount Vineuo	2,536	8,320	Papua New Guinea
Negoiu Peak	2,535	8,317	Romania
Vistea Mare	2,527	8,291	Romania
Pidurutalagala	2,524	8,281	Sri Lanka
Mount Norquay	2,522	8,274	Canadian Rockies, Canada
Hualalai	2,521	8,271	Hawaii, US
Mount Yesenin	2,520	8,270	Antarctica
Parangu Mare	2,519	8,264	Romania
Mount Taranaki/Egmont	2,518	8,261	New Zealand
Garfield Peak	2,512	8,241	Wyoming, US
Mount Joern	2,510	8,230	Antarctica
Mount Veniaminof	2,507	8,225	Alaska, US
Omu Peak	2,505	8,219	Romania
Rysy	2,501	8,205	Tatras, Poland/Slovakia – Highest in Poland
Mount Tymfi	2,497	8,192	Pindus, Greece
Monte Velino	2,487	8,159	Abruzzo Italy
Monte Vettore	2,476	8,123	Abruzzo Italy
Špik	2,472	8,110	Julian Alps, Slovenia
Luna Peak	2,470	8,100	British Columbia, Canada
Galdhøpiggen	2,469	8,100	Norway – Highest
Kanlaon	2,465	8,087	Negros Occidental and Negros Oriental, Philippines
Glittertind	2,464	8,084	Norway
El Capitan	2,464	8,084	Texas, US
Shimbiris	2,464	8,084	Somalia
Mayon	2,463	8,081	Albay, Philippines
Monte Gorzano	2,458	8,064	Abruzzo Italy
Mount Psiloritis	2,456	8,058	Crete, Greece
Mount Pachnes (Lefka Ori)	2,453	8,048	Crete, Greece
Sulphur Mountain	2,451	8,041	Canadian Rockies, Canada
Sunset Crater	2,451	8,041	Arizona, US
Cima del Redentore (Sibillini Mountains)	2,448	8,031	Marche–Umbria, Italy
Triple Divide Peak	2,444	8,018	Montana, US
Blackcomb Peak	2,436	7,992	Whistler BC, Canada
Monte Binga	2,436	7,992	Manica, Mozambique
Mount Olympus	2,432	7,979	Washington, US
Peñalara	2,430	7,970	Spain
Mesa de los Tres Reyes	2,428	7,966	Navarre, Spain – Highest point in Navarre
Roque de los Muchachos	2,426	7,959	La Palma, Spain
Mount Daniel	2,426	7,959	Washington, US
Mount Murud	2,423	7,949	Kelabit Highlands, Sarawak, Malaysia – Highest mountain in Sarawak
Mocho	2,422	7,946	Los Ríos Region, Chile
Choshuenco	2,415	7,923	Los Ríos Region, Chile
Grigna Settentrionale	2,410	7,910	Province of Lecco, Lombardy, Italy
Ha Ling Peak	2,408	7,900	Canadian Rockies, Alberta, Canada
Store Skagastølstind	2,405	7,890	Norway
Hajla	2,403	7,884	Kosovo
Le Tabor	2,389	7,838	Dauphine Alps, France
Kirigalpottha	2,388	7,835	Sri Lanka
Maglić	2,386	7,828	Bosnia and Herzegovina – Highest in Bosnia and Herzegovina
Emory Peak	2,385	7,825	Texas, US
Mount Cayley	2,385	7,825	British Columbia, Canada
Mount Galwey	2,377	7,799	Canadian Rockies, Canada
Botev Peak	2,376	7,795	Balkan Mountain, Bulgaria
Mount Mulu	2,376	7,795	Gunung Mulu National Park, Sarawak, Malaysia
Mount Deception	2,374	7,789	Washington, US
Mount Aix	2,367	7,766	Washington, US
Mount Karthala	2,361	7,746	Comoros, Indian Ocean
Signal Mountain	2,353	7,720	Wyoming, US
Mount Pico	2,351	7,713	Azores, Portugal – Highest in Portugal
Grimming	2,351	7,713	Styria, Austria – Highest monolith in Europe
Monte Sirente	2,347	7,700	Abruzzo, Italy
Mount Blum	2,340	7,680	North Cascades, Washington State, US
Mount Popomanaseu	2,335	7,661	Guadalcanal, Solomon Islands – Highest in Solomon Islands
Monte Priora	2,333	7,654	Marche Italy
Mount Prophet	2,330	7,640	North Cascades
Mount Griggs	2,317	7,602	Alaska, US
Mount Makarakomburu	2,310	7,580	Guadalcanal, Solomon Islands
Lalla Khedidja	2,308	7,572	Djurdjura Mountains, Algeria
Lavender Peak	2,306	7,566	British Columbia, Canada
Mount Sir Allan MacNab	2,297	7,536	Premier Range, British Columbia, Canada
Murree	2,291	7,516	Rawalpindi, Pakistan
Cherni Vrah	2,290	7,510	Vitosha Mountain, Bulgaria
Mount Karadağ	2,288	7,507	Turkey
Druesberg	2,282	7,487	Alps, Switzerland
Ineu Peak	2,279	7,477	Rodnei Mountains, Romanian Carpathian Mountains, Romania
Mount Huye	2,278	7,474	Rwanda
Bikku Bitti	2,267	7,438	Libya – Second highest in country
Blue Mountains	2,256	7,402	Jamaica – Highest in Country
Mount Dietz	2,250	7,380	Antarctica
Sri Pada Mountain	2,243	7,359	Sri Lanka
Mount John Laurie	2,240	7,350	Canadian Rockies, Alberta, Canada
Red Butte	2,232	7,323	Arizona, US
Čvrsnica	2,228	7,310	Herzegovina, BiH
Mount Kosciuszko	2,228	7,310	Snowy Mountains, New South Wales, Australia – Highest on mainland
Camoghe	2,228	7,310	Ticino, Switzerland
Commonwealth Mountain	2,225	7,300	Nunavut, Canada
Mount Chiginagak	2,221	7,287	Alaska, US
Monte Terminillo	2,217	7,274	Lazio, Italy
Slavyanka	2,212	7,257	Pirin Mountain, Bulgaria
Mount Oxford (Nunavut)	2,210	7,250	Nunavut, Canada
Mount Townsend	2,209	7,247	Snowy Mountains, New South Wales, Australia – Second-highest on mainland
Black Elk Peak	2,207	7,241	South Dakota, US – Highest in state
Golden Hinde	2,198	7,211	#1 on Vancouver Island, British Columbia, Canada
Mount Twynam	2,196	7,205	Snowy Mountains, New South Wales, Australia – Third-highest on mainland
Elkhorn Mountain	2,195	7,201	Vancouver Island, British Columbia, Canada
Mount Baldy	2,192	7,192	Alberta, Canada
Golyam Perelik	2,191	7,188	Rhodope Mountains, Bulgaria
Shiprock	2,188	7,178	New Mexico, US
Mount Tahan	2,187	7,175	Tahan Range, Pahang, Malaysia – Highest in Peninsular Malaysia
Grigna Meridionale	2,184	7,165	Province of Lecco, Lombardy, Italy
Mount Korbu	2,183	7,162	Titiwangsa Mountains, Perak, Malaysia
Mount Yong Belar	2,180	7,150	Perak, Malaysia
Doi Chiang Dao	2,175	7,136	Thailand
Galunggung	2,168	7,113	Java
Levski Peak	2,166	7,106	Balkan Mountain, Bulgaria
Monte Cimone	2,165	7,103	Emilia-Romagna, Italy
Mount Hua	2,155	7,070	Shaanxi, China
Mount Zulia	2,149	7,051	Uganda
Carruthers Peak	2,145	7,037	Snowy Mountains, New South Wales, Australia
Crna Glava	2,139	7,018	Bjelasica, Montenegro
Mount Colonel Foster	2,135	7,005	Vancouver Island, British Columbia, Canada
Roche à Perdrix	2,135	7,005	Fiddle Range, Canadian Rockies, Canada
Kodaikanal	2,133	6,998	Tamil Nadu, India
Pilatus	2,132	6,995	Switzerland
Strmenica	2,122	6,962	Bjelasica, Montenegro
Phu Soi Dao	2,120	6,960	Thailand/Laos
Eagle Peak	2,119	6,952	Alaska, US
Öræfajökull	2,110	6,920	Iceland
Mount Benum	2,107	6,913	Malaysia
Mogotón	2,107	6,913	Nicaragua – Highest in Nicaragua
Kebnekaise	2,097	6,880	Sweden
Rambler Peak	2,092	6,864	Vancouver Island, British Columbia, Canada
Mount McBride	2,083	6,834	Vancouver Island, British Columbia, Canada
Phou Khe	2,079	6,821	Thailand/Laos
Schneeberg	2,076	6,811	Northern Limestone Alps, Austria
Mount Tate	2,068	6,785	Snowy Mountains, New South Wales, Australia
Bjelašnica	2,067	6,781	Sarajevo Canton, Bosnia and Herzegovina
Kings Peak	2,065	6,775	Vancouver Island, British Columbia, Canada
Hoverla	2,061	6,762	Ukraine – Highest
Monte Miletto	2,050	6,730	Molise, Italy
Lytton Mountain	2,049	6,722	British Columbia, Canada
Mount Katmai	2,047	6,716	Alaska, US
Mount Dimlang	2,042	6,699	Adamawa, Nigeria
Mount Celeste	2,041	6,696	Vancouver Island, British Columbia, Canada
Mount Mitchell	2,037	6,683	Yancey County, North Carolina, US; Highest peak of the Appalachian Mountains; Highest peak in mainland eastern North America
Namunukula	2,035	6,677	Sri Lanka
Pico do Barbado	2,033	6,670	Bahia, Brazil – Highest point in Bahia
Mount Batu Brinchang	2,032	6,667	Cameron Highlands, Pahang/Perak, Malaysia
Doi Mae Tho	2,031	6,663	Thailand
Kuwohi	2,025	6,644	Great Smoky Mountains, Tennessee, US
Mount Heng (Shanxi)	2,017	6,617	Shanxi, China
Kopaonik	2,017	6,617	Pančić's Peak, Serbia
Alpe di Succiso	2,017	6,617	Province of Reggio Emilia Italy
Kom	2,016	6,614	Balkan Mountain, Bulgaria
Polar Bear Peak	2,016	6,614	Chugach Mountains, Alaska, US
Mount Asgard	2,015	6,611	Baffin Mountains, Nunavut, Canada
Mount Le Conte	2,010	6,590	Great Smoky Mountains, Tennessee, US

== 1,000 metres ==
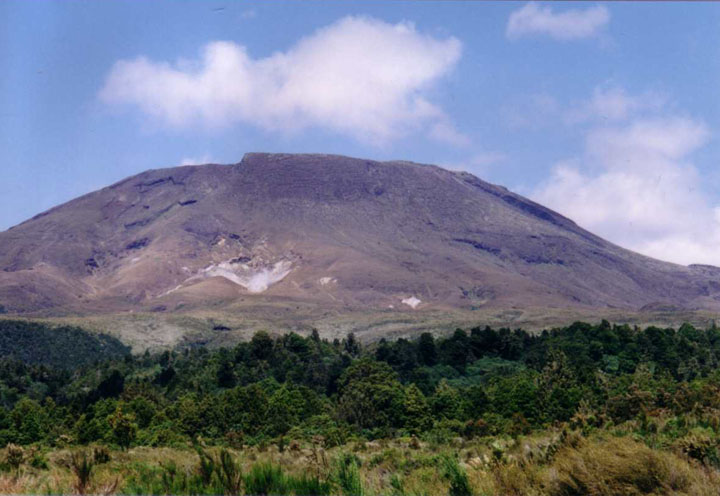
Mount Tongariro – 1,978 m (6,490 ft)

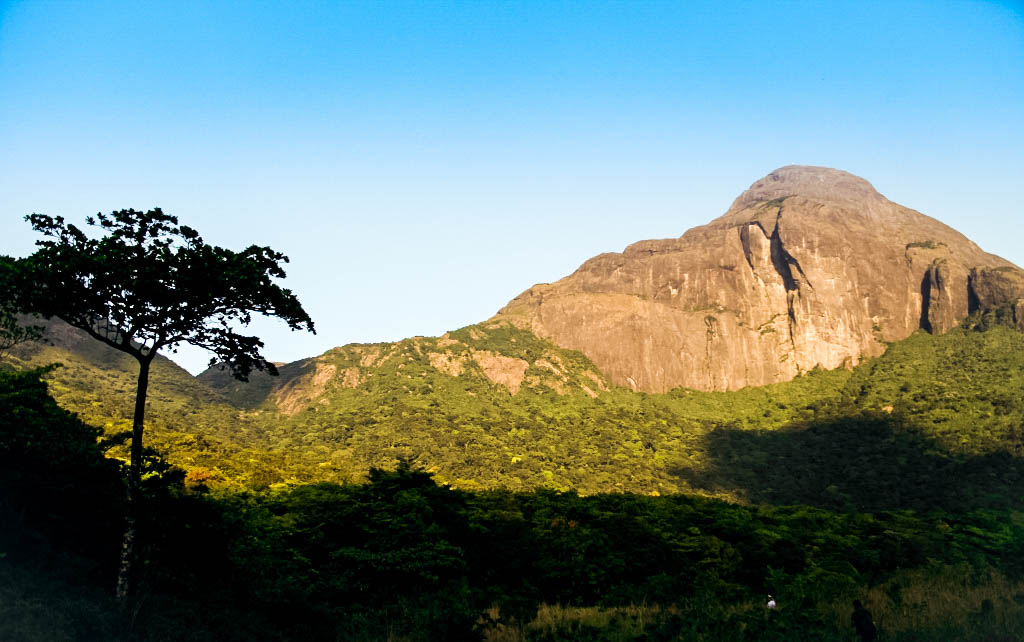
Agastya Mala – 1,868 m (6,129 ft)

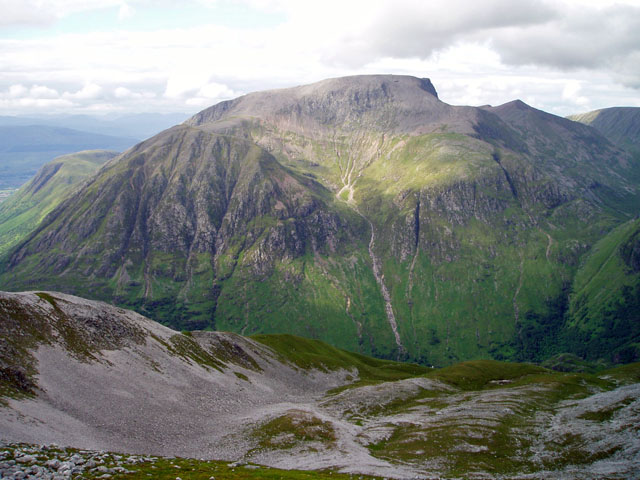
Ben Nevis – 1,345 m (4,413 ft)

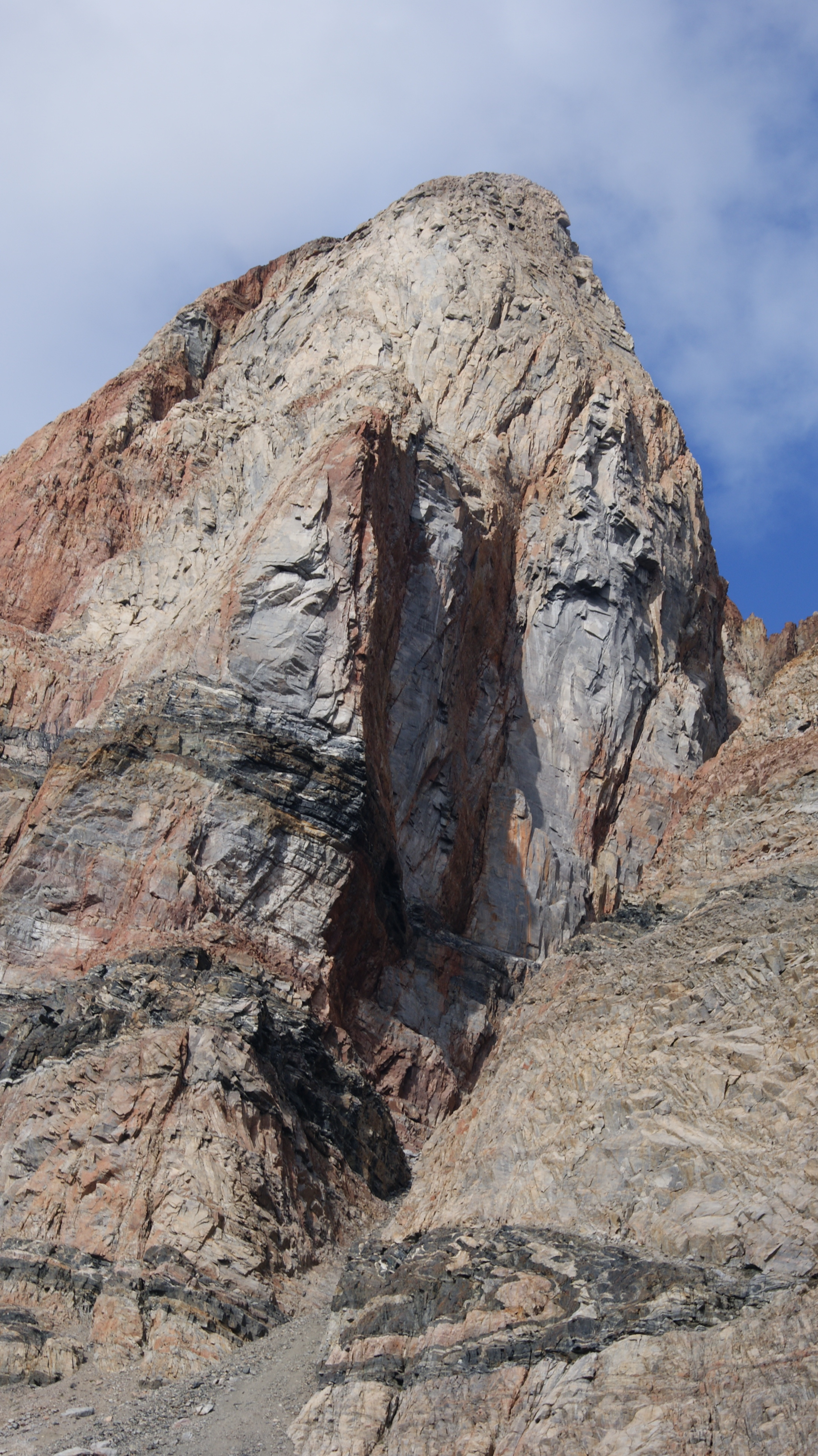
Uummannaq – 1,070 m (3,510 ft)

Mountain	Metres	Feet	Location and notes
Serra da Estrela	1,993	6,539	Portugal
Mount Bogong	1,986	6,516	Australia – Highest in Victoria
Mount Ishizuchi	1,982	6,503	Japan – Tallest in Western Japan
Doi Phu Kha	1,980	6,500	Luang Prabang Range, Thailand
Pizzo Carbonara	1,979	6,493	Province of Palermo Sicily
Topo de Coroa	1,979	6,493	Cape Verde
Mount Tongariro	1,978	6,490	New Zealand
Iceberg Peak	1,977	6,486	Vancouver Island, British Columbia, Canada
Pico Turquino	1,975	6,480	Cuba – Highest point
El Piveto Mountain	1,969	6,460	Vancouver Island, British Columbia, Canada
Qiajivik Mountain	1,963	6,440	Baffin Island, Nunavut, Canada
Monte Tamaro	1,962	6,437	Ticino, Switzerland
Montalto (Aspromonte)	1,955	6,414	Calabria, Italy
Ciucas Peak	1,954	6,411	Romania
Chionistra	1,952	6,404	Cyprus
Hallasan	1,950	6,400	Jejudo, South Korea – Highest mountain in South Korea
Pico de las Nieves	1,949	6,394	Gran Canaria. Spain
Jabal Bil Ays	1,934	6,345	Oman
Mullayanagiri	1,930	6,330	Chikmagalur, Karnataka, India
Helvetia Tinde	1,929	6,329	Roosevelt Range – Highest peak in Peary Land, Northern Greenland
Botte Donato	1,928	6,325	Sila Mountains, Calabria, Italy
Mount Feathertop	1,922	6,306	Victorian Alps, Australia
Mount Washington	1,917	6,289	Presidential Range, White Mtns., Appalachian Mountains, US – Highest in American Northeast
Mount Jiri	1,915	6,283	South Korea
Troglav	1,913	6,276	Highest peak of mountain Dinara, Bosnia and Herzegovina
Mont Ventoux	1,909	6,263	France
Vesper Peak	1,896	6,220	Washington, US
Baba Budangiri	1,895	6,217	Chikmagalur, Karnataka, India
Mount Narodnaya	1,895	6,217	Subpolar Urals, Russia
Kudremukh	1,894	6,214	Chikmagalur, Karnataka, India
Orjen	1,894	6,214	Montenegro, Bosnia and Herzegovina
Iskhodnaya	1,887	6,191	Russia – Highest of the Chukotka Mountains
Mount George V	1,883	6,178	Vancouver Island, British Columbia, Canada
Monte Resegone	1,875	6,152	Province of Lecco, Lombardy, Italy
Rugged Mountain	1,875	6,152	Vancouver Island, British Columbia, Canada
Agastya Mala	1,868	6,129	Tamil Nadu/Kerala, India
Trident Volcano	1,864	6,115	Alaska, US
Mount Martin	1,863	6,112	Alaska, US
Knuckles	1,862	6,109	Sri Lanka
Pico Ruivo	1,861	6,106	Madeira, Portugal
Pico das Torres	1,853	6,079	Madeira, Portugal
Mont Ross	1,850	6,070	Gallieni Massif, Kerguelen Islands
Cucurbata Mare	1,849	6,066	Romania
Crown Mountain	1,846	6,056	Vancouver Island, British Columbia, Canada
Loser	1,838	6,030	Austria
Punta La Marmora	1,834	6,017	Sardinia
Cerro La Campana	1,828	5,997	Olmue, Chile
Gora Nevskaya	1,828	5,997	Magadan Oblast, Russia – Highest of the Kolyma Mountains
Cerro de la Silla	1,820	5,970	Mexico
Pico do Arieiro	1,818	5,965	Madeira, Portugal
Roque Nublo	1,813	5,948	Gran Canaria, Spain
Biligiriranga Hills	1,800	5,900	Chamarajanagar, Karnataka, India
Monte Maggiorasca	1,799	5,902	liguria - Emilia-Romagna Italy
Rigi	1,797	5,896	Swiss Alps
Goru	1,784	5,853	Romania
Blokhin Peak	1,779	5,837	Chukotka, Russian Federation – Highest in Anyuy Range
Velliangiri Mountains	1,778	5,833	Coimbatore, Tamil Nadu, India
Penteleu	1,772	5,814	Romania
Mount Veve	1,768	5,801	Kolombangara, Solomon Islands
Mount Adams	1,766	5,794	New Hampshire, US
Pik Sovetskoy Gvardii	1,759	5,771	Chukotka, Russian Federation
Mount Api	1,750	5,740	Gunung Mulu National Park, Sarawak, Malaysia
Lovćen	1,749	5,738	Montenegro
Tadiandamol	1,748	5,735	Kodagu, Karnataka, India
Mount Rogers	1,746	5,728	Virginia, US – Highest point in state
Doi Phi Pan Nam	1,745	5,725	Luang Prabang Range, Thailand
Mount Wilson	1,742	5,715	California, US
Mount Jefferson	1,741	5,712	New Hampshire, US
Monte Amiata	1,738	5,702	Province of Grosseto Italy
Daisen	1,729	5,673	Japan
Babia Góra	1,724	5,656	Żywiec Beskids, Poland/Slovakia
The Horn (Mount Buffalo)	1,723	5,653	Victoria, Australia
Mount Batur	1,717	5,633	Bali, Indonesia
Kumara Parvata	1,712	5,617	Dakshina Kannada, Karnataka, India
Pushpagiri	1,712	5,617	Pushpagiri Wildlife Sanctuary, Karnataka, India
Mount Lowe	1,707	5,600	San Gabriel Mountains, California, US
Boulder Peak	1,707	5,600	Olympic Mountains, Washington, US
Doi Luang	1,694	5,558	Thailand – Highest in the Phi Pan Nam Range
Mitre Peak	1,692	5,551	New Zealand
Taungthonton Volcano	1,680	5,510	Myanmar
Arma Konda	1,680	5,510	India – Highest in Andhra Pradesh
Deomali	1,672	5,486	India – Highest in Odisha
Mount Caubvick	1,652	5,420	Torngat Mountains, Canada
Kalsubai	1,646	5,400	India – Highest in Maharashtra State
Peak 5390	1,643	5,390	Alaska, US
Yamantau	1,640	5,380	Southern Urals, Russia
Mount Monroe	1,637	5,371	New Hampshire, US
Mount Madison	1,636	5,367	New Hampshire, US
Mount Krebs	1,630	5,350	Antarctica
Mount Marcy	1,629	5,344	New York, US
Trebević	1,627	5,338	Bosnia and Herzegovina
Mount Bartle Frere	1,622	5,322	Queensland, Australia
Rocca Busambra	1,613	5,292	Province of Palermo Sicily
Velky Rozsutec	1,610	5,280	Mala Fatra, Slovakia
Brahmagiri	1,608	5,276	Kodagu, Karnataka, India
Mount Katahdin	1,606	5,269	Maine, US
Sněžka	1,603	5,259	Giant Mountains, Poland/Czech Republic – Highest in Czech Republic
Sirumalai	1,600	5,200	Tamil Nadu India
Mount Lafayette	1,600	5,200	New Hampshire, US
Mount Washington (British Columbia)	1,590	5,220	Vancouver Island, British Columbia, Canada
Mount Benarat	1,585	5,200	Gunung Mulu National Park, Sarawak, Malaysia
Wai'ale'ale	1,569	5,148	Kauai, Hawaii, US
Salher	1,567	5,141	Maharashtra, India
Cirque Mountain	1,567	5,141	Labrador, Canada
Algonquin Peak	1,559	5,115	New York, US
Mount Lincoln	1,551	5,089	New Hampshire, US
Mount Lukens	1,547	5,075	California, US
Superstition Mountain	1,542	5,059	Arizona, US
Mount Tai	1,532	5,026	Shandong, China
Jabel Yibir	1,527	5,010	United Arab Emirates
Madikeri	1,525	5,003	Kodagu, Karnataka, India
Mount Popa	1,518	4,980	Myanmar
Askja	1,516	4,974	Iceland
Monte Boglia	1,516	4,974	Ticino, Switzerland
Song Shan	1,512	4,961	Henan, China
Mount Haystack	1,512	4,961	New York, US
Pico de Malpaso	1,501	4,925	El Hierro, Spain
Mount Skylight	1,501	4,925	New York, US
Javaleon	1,494	4,902	Spain
Mount Nuang	1,491	4,892	Titiwangsa Mountains, Malaysia
Hekla	1,491	4,892	Iceland
Alto de Garanjonay	1,487	4,879	La Gomera, Spain
Mount Pinatubo	1,486	4,875	Luzon, Philippines
Whiteface Mountain	1,483.462	4,867.00	New York, US
Spruce Knob	1,482	4,862	West Virginia, US
Dix Mountain	1,480	4,860	New York, US
Gray Peak (New York)	1,475	4,839	New York, US
Iroquois Peak	1,475	4,839	New York, US
Lyaskovets Peak	1,473	4,833	Antarctica
Mount Olympus	1,471	4,826	Tasmania, Australia
Basin Mountain (New York)	1,471	4,826	New York, US
La Grande Soufrière	1,467	4,813	Guadeloupe, France
Monte Penice	1,460	4,790	Lombardy – Emilia-Romagna, Italy
Brasstown Bald	1,458	4,783	Georgia (U.S. state), United States
Mount Seymour	1,455	4,774	British Columbia, Canada
Himavad Gopalaswamy Betta	1,450	4,760	Chamarajanagar, Karnataka, India
Snæfellsjökull	1,446	4,744	Iceland
Gothics	1,444	4,738	New York, US
Mount Colden	1,436.8	4,714	New York, US
Mount Kalourat	1,435	4,708	Malaita, Solomon Islands
Ngarutjaranya	1,435	4,708	Australia – Highest in South Australia
Cypress Mountain	1,432	4,698	British Columbia, Canada
Taramati	1,431	4,695	Maharashtra, India
Harishchandragad	1,427	4,682	Maharashtra, India
Tukgahgo Mountain	1,425	4,675	Alaska, US
Giant Mountain	1,410.3	4,627	New York, US
Nippletop	1,408.2	4,620	New York, US
Pikui	1,408	4,619	Ukraine – Highest point in Lvivshchyna
Santanoni Peak	1,404.2	4,607	New York, US
Mount Redfield	1,403.9	4,606	New York, US
Raireshwar	1,398	4,587	Maharashtra, India
Wright Peak	1,396	4,580	New York, US
Taburno Camposauro	1,393	4,570	Campania Italy
Saddleback Mountain	1,376.2	4,515	New York, US
Mount Belinda	1,370	4,490	South Georgia and the South Sandwich Islands, UK – Highest in the British Overseas Territories
Parasnath	1,366	4,482	India – Highest in Jharkhand State
Panther Peak	1,354	4,442	New York, US
Dhupgarh	1,350	4,430	India – Highest in Madhya Pradesh
Table Top Mountain	1,349.4	4,427	New York, US
Rocky Peak Ridge	1,347.2	4,420	New York, US
Ben Nevis	1,345	4,413	Scotland, United Kingdom – Highest in the UK
Kodachadri	1,343	4,406	Shimoga, Karnataka, India
Macomb Mountain	1,342.6	4,405	New York, US
Mount Jiuhua	1,342	4,403	Anhui, China
Armstrong Mountain	1,341.1	4,400	New York, US
Hough Peak	1,341.1	4,400	New York, US
Mount Aniakchak	1,341	4,400	Alaska, US
Mount Mansfield	1,339	4,393	Green Mountains, Vermont, US – Highest in Vermont
Cerro de Punta	1,338	4,390	Jayuya, Puerto Rico – Highest in Puerto Rico
Seward Mountain (New York)	1,329.2	4,361	New York, US
Mount Marshall	1,329	4,360	New York, US
Allen Mountain (New York)	1,332.8	4,373	New York, US
Mount Bassie	1,311	4,301	Alaska, US
Ben Macdui	1,309	4,295	Scotland, United Kingdom
Mount Kanaga	1,307	4,288	Alaska, US
Sinhagad	1,303	4,275	Maharashtra, India
Mount Heng (Hunan)	1,300	4,300	Hunan, China
Braeriach	1,296	4,252	Scotland, United Kingdom
Big Slide Mountain (New York)	1,292.4	4,240	New York, US
Esther Mountain	1,292.4	4,240	New York, US
Rajabasa	1,281	4,203	Sumatra, Indonesia
Mount Vesuvius	1,281	4,203	Italy
Mount Ophir	1,276	4,186	Titiwangsa Mountains, Johor, Malaysia
Bailadila	1,276	4,186	India – Highest in Chhattisgarh State
Upper Wolfjaw	1,275.6	4,185	New York
Lower Wolfjaw	1,272.5	4,175	New York, US
Mount Wellington	1,271	4,170	Tasmania, Australia
Mount Si	1,270	4,170	Washington, US
Street Mountain	1,269.8	4,166	New York, US
Phelps Mountain	1,268.3	4,161	New York, US
Mount Qingcheng	1,260	4,130	Sichuan, China
Detunata	1,258	4,127	Romania
Mount Donna Buang	1,250	4,100	Victoria, Australia
Kīlauea	1,247	4,091	Hawaii, US
Camel's Hump	1,244	4,081	Vermont, US
Cannon Mountain	1,240	4,070	New Hampshire, US
The Priest	1,238	4,062	Blue Ridge Mountains, Virginia, US
Aonach Beag	1,234	4,049	Scotland, United Kingdom
Grouse Mountain	1,231	4,039	British Columbia, Canada
Kaʻala	1,220	4,000	Oahu, Hawaii, US
Mount Jerai	1,217	3,993	Titiwangsa Mountains, Kedah, Malaysia
Fichtelberg	1,215	3,986	Ore Mountains, Saxony, Germany
Mount Gozaisho	1,212	3,976	Suzuka Mountains, Mie Prefecture, Japan
Mount Meron	1,208	3,963	Galilee, Israel – Highest in Israel (inside the '67 borders)
Mount Fromme	1,185	3,888	British Columbia, Canada
Doi Ian	1,174	3,852	Phi Pan Nam Range, Thailand
Mount Diablo	1,173	3,848	California, US
Mount Hombori	1,155	3,789	Mali – Highest in Mali
Lochnagar	1,155	3,789	Scotland
Bidean nam Bian	1,150	3,770	Scotland
Monte Musinè	1,150	3,770	Piedmont, Italy
Brocken	1,141	3,743	Saxony-Anhalt, Germany – Highest mountain in the Harz; highest in Saxony-Anhalt
Victoria Peak	1,120	3,670	Belize – 2nd highest mountain in Belize
Gora Sovetskaya	1,096	3,596	Wrangel Island, Chukotka, Russian Federation – Highest in Wrangel Island
Kayser Mountain	1,094	3,589	Greenland
Mount Juneau	1,090	3,580	Alaska, US
Roxy Ann Peak	1,090	3,580	Oregon, US
Snowdon (Yr Wyddfa)	1,085	3,560	Gwynedd, Wales, United Kingdom – Highest in Wales
Table Mountain	1,085	3,560	South Africa
Flattop Mountain	1,070	3,510	Alaska, US
Uummannaq	1,070	3,510	Greenland
White Butte	1,069	3,507	North Dakota, US – Highest in state
Hogback Mountain	1,059	3,474	Virginia, US
Liathach	1,055	3,461	Torridon, Scotland
Saka Haphong	1,052	3,451	Bandarban, Bangladesh
Corrán Tuathail	1,038	3,406	County Kerry, Ireland – Highest mountain in Ireland
Mount Ramon	1,037	3,402	Negev, Israel
Girnar	1,031	3,383	Gujarat, India
Mount Zagora	1,030	3,380	Morocco
Mount Nabi Yunis	1,030	3,380	Hebron, Palestine
Buachaille Etive Mor	1,022	3,353	Glen Etive, Scotland
Munboksan	1,015	3,330	South Korea
Kékes	1,014	3,327	Hungary – Highest mountain in Hungary
Mount Belumut	1,010	3,310	Johor, Malaysia
Old Rag Mountain	1,001	3,284	Virginia, US
Devil's Peak	1,000	3,300	Cape Town, South Africa

== Under 1,000 metres ==
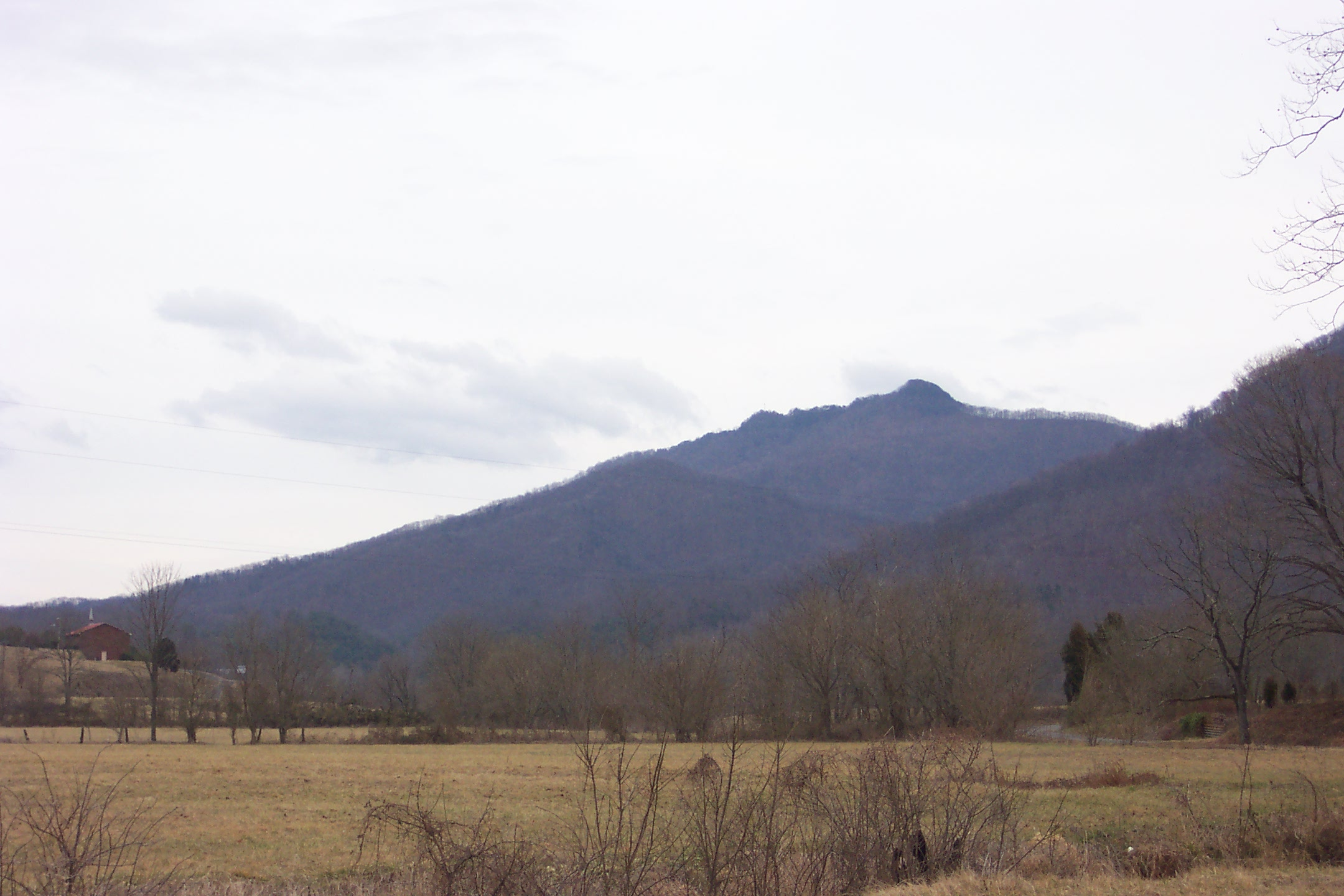
Chimneytop – 950.1 m (3,117 ft)

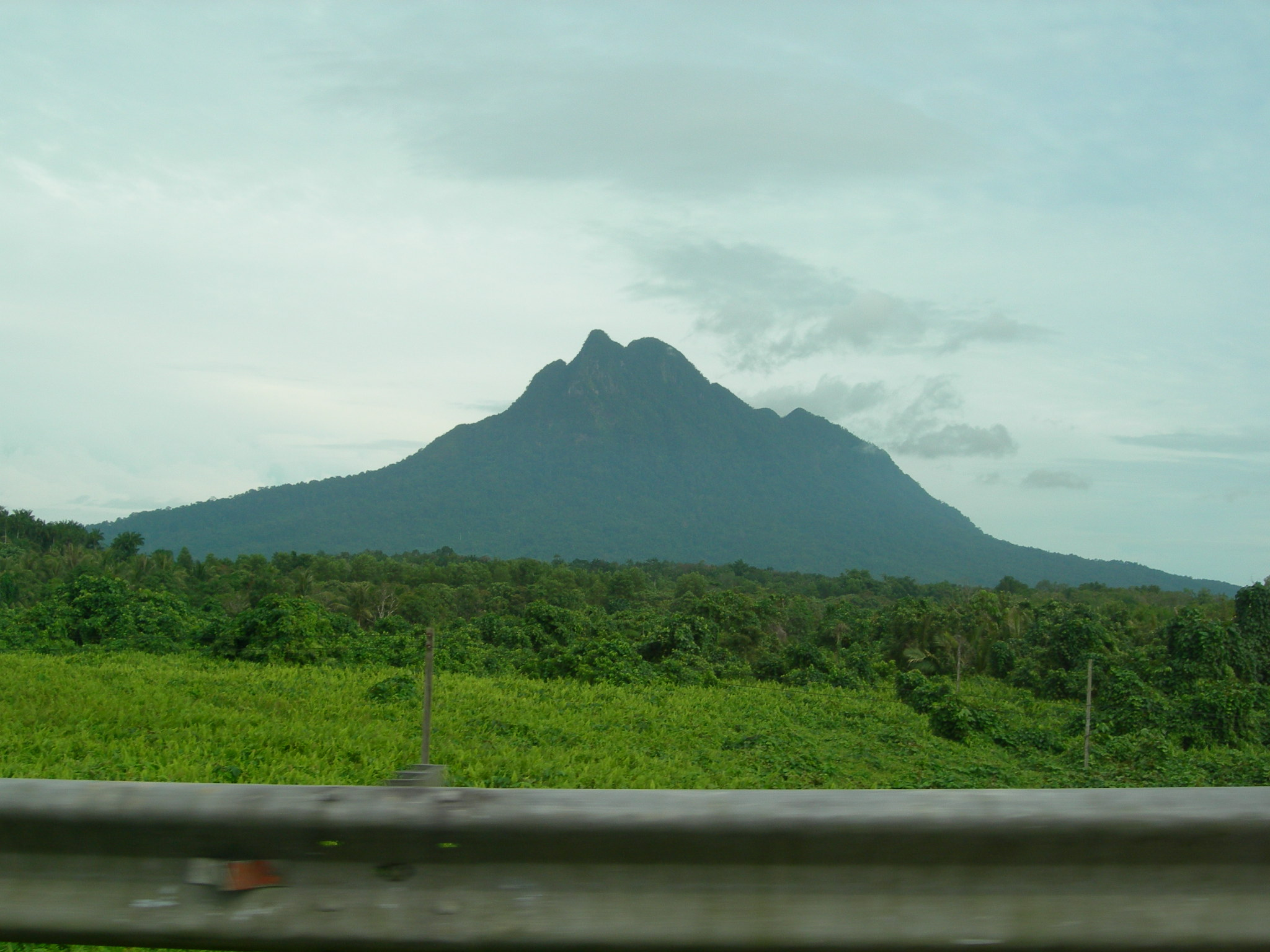
Mount Santubong – 810 m (2,657 ft)

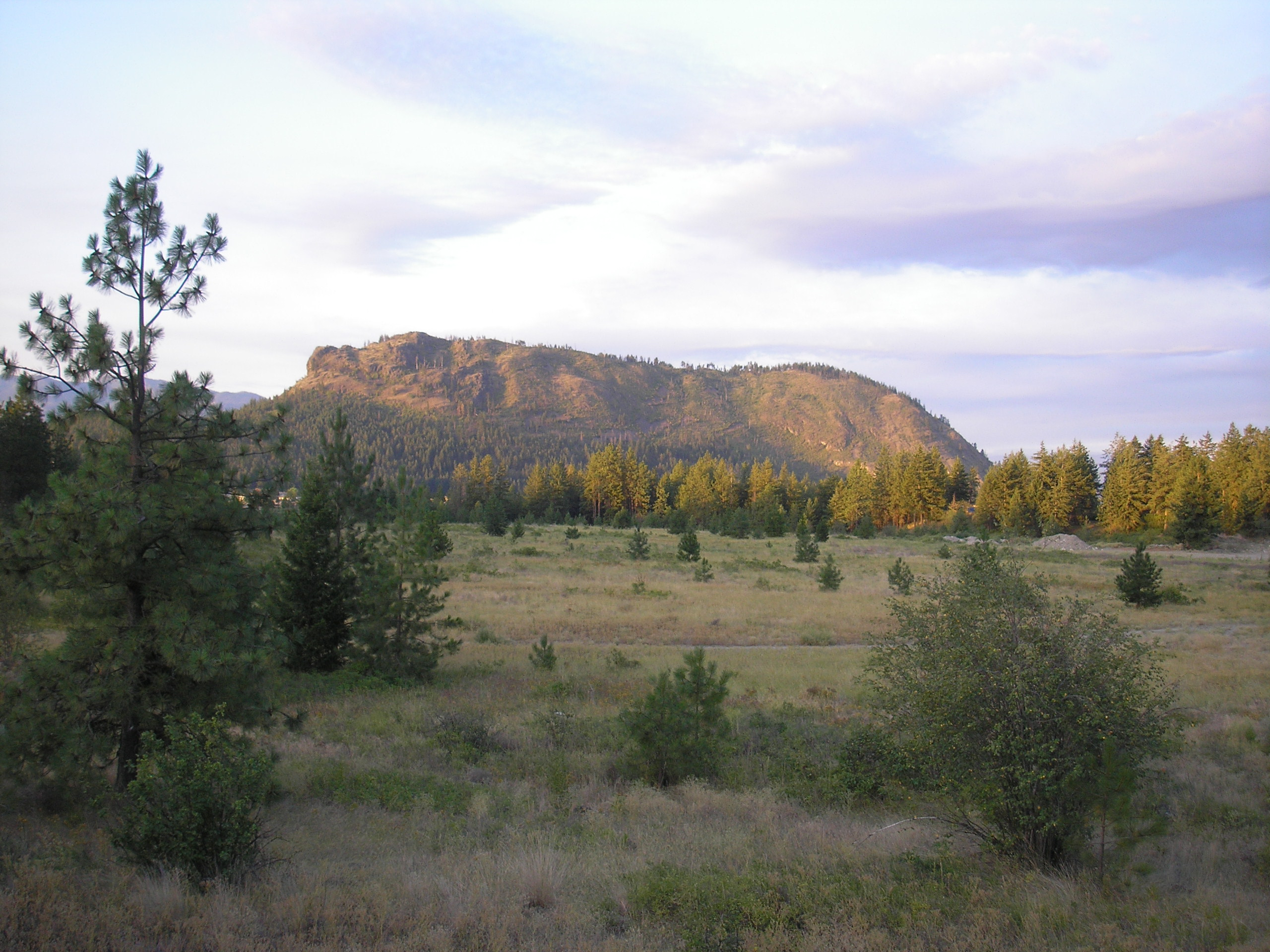
Mt. Boucherie – 758 m (2,487 ft)

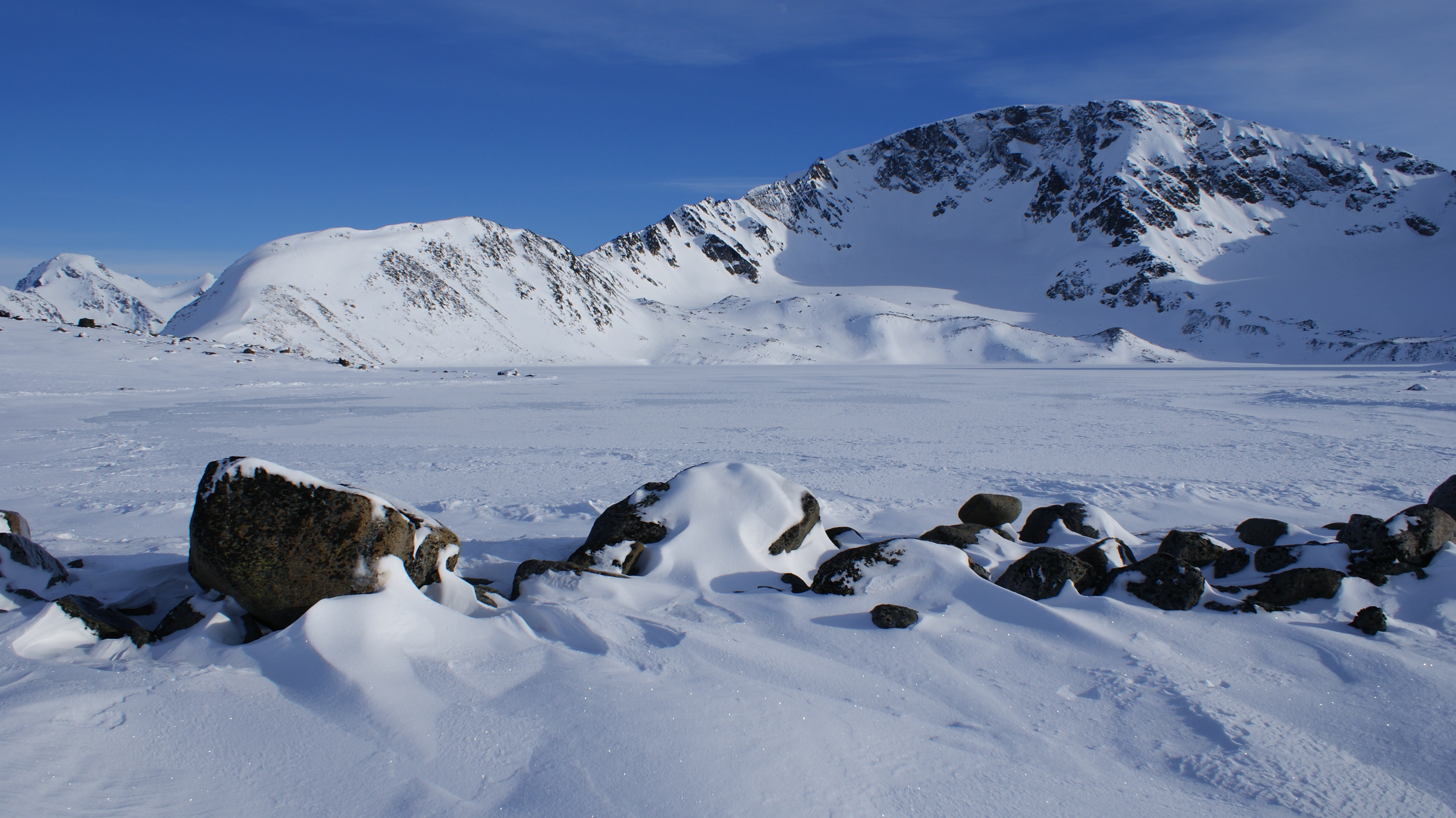
Qalorujoorneq – 676 m (2,218 ft)

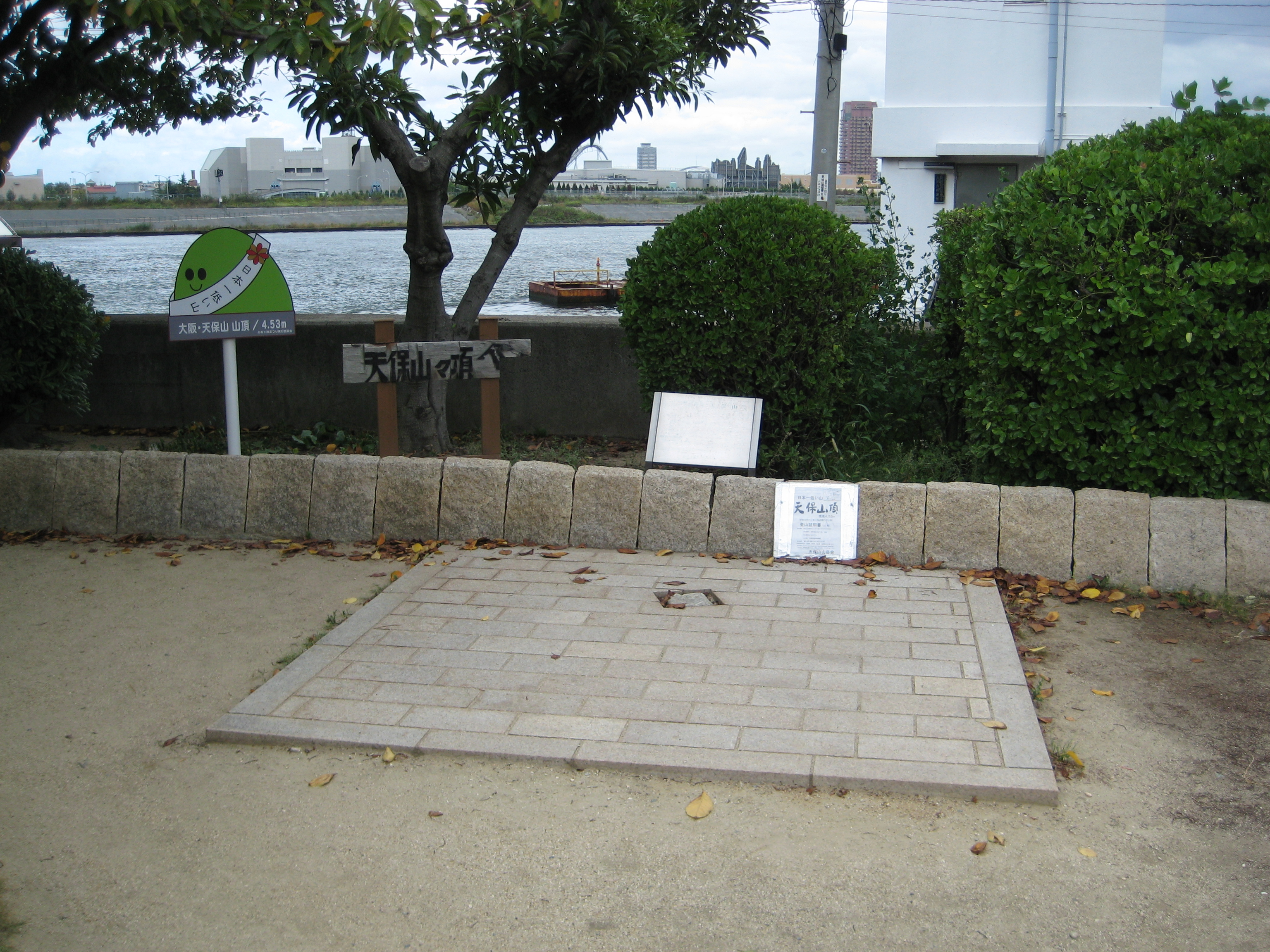
Mount Tenpō, One of World's Lowest Mountain. – 5 m (16 ft)

Mountain	Metres	Feet	Range	Location and notes
Sgurr Dearg	986	3,235	Cuillin	Scotland
Großer Beerberg	983	3,225	Thuringian Forest	Thuringia, Germany
Mount Sizer	980	3,220	Diablo Range	US (California)
Mount Valin	980	3,220	Saguenay Lac St-Jean	Canada (Québec)
Hyangnosan	979	3,212		Gyeongnam Province, South Korea
Scafell Pike	978	3,209	Southern Fells	England (Cumbria) – Highest in England
Mount Edgecumbe	976	3,202		US (Alaska)
Grand Bonhomme	973	3,192		Saint Vincent and the Grenadines
North Mountain (Catskills)	969	3,179	Catskill Escarpment	US (New York)
Doli Gutta	965	3,166	Deccan Plateau	India – Highest in Telangana State
Mount Monadnock	965	3,166		US (New Hampshire) – One of the most frequently climbed in the world
Mount Pirongia	959	3,146	Hakarimata Range	New Zealand
Tai Mo Shan	957	3,140		Hong Kong – Highest in Hong Kong
Chimneytop	950.1	3,117	Bays Mountain Range	Tennessee, US
Helvellyn	950	3,120	Eastern Fells	England (Cumbria)
Mount Gimie	950	3,120		Saint Lucia – Highest point
El Cerro del Aripo	940	3,080	Northern Range	Trinidad and Tobago – Highest point
El Tucuche	936	3,071	Northern Range	Trinidad and Tobago
Lantau Peak	934	3,064		Hong Kong
Mount Taungnyo	931	3,054		Myanmar
Betlingchhip	930	3,050	Jampui Hills	India – Highest in Tripura
Kaimondake volcano	924	3,031		Kagoshima, Japan
San Salvatore	912	2,992		Ticino, Switzerland
Pantokrator	906	2,972		Greece (Corfu)
Edinburgh Peak	904	2,966		Tristan Da Cunha, Atlantic Ocean
Cadair Idris	893	2,930		Wales
Pen y Fan	886	2,907		Wales
Baekunsan	885	2,904		Ulsan, South Korea
Mount Gerizim	881	2,890		West Bank
Sunset Peak	869	2,851		Hong Kong
Mahuli	858	2,815		Thane District, Maharashtra, India
Mount Taylor	856	2,808		Canberra, Australia
Slieve Donard	856	2,808	Mourne Mountains	County Down, Northern Ireland
Tinakula	851	2,792	Tinakula	Solomon Islands
Mount Saint Catherine	840	2,760		Grenada – Highest point
Mount Magazine	839	2,753	Ozark Mountains	Arkansas, US
Hoemunsan	837	2,746		North Jeolla Province, South Korea
Bukhansan (Baegundae Peak)	836.5	2,744		Seoul, South Korea
Piton de la Petite Rivière Noire	828	2,717		Black River Mountain Range, Mauritius
Pieter Both (mountain)	820	2,690		Mauritius
Mount Carleton	817	2,680	Appalachian Mountains	Canada (New Brunswick)
The Cheviot	815	2,674	Cheviot Hills	England (Northumberland)
Le Pouce	811	2,661		Mauritius
Mount Santubong	810	2,660		Malaysia (Sarawak)
Pico de la Zarza	807	2,648		Spain (Fuerteventura)
Gros Morne	807	2,648		Canada (Newfoundland)
Clisham	799	2,621		Harris, Western Isles, Scotland
Mount Tamalpais	792	2,598	California Coast Ranges	US (California)
Mission Peak	790	2,590	Diablo Range	US (California)
Gyemyeongsan	774	2,539		North Chungcheong Province, South Korea
Mount Boucherie	758	2,487		Canada (British Columbia)
Daeunsan	742	2,434		South Korea
Mount Dobong	740	2,430		South Korea
Mount Lofty	727	2,385		South Australia
Ben Cleuch	721	2,365		Scotland
Corps de Garde	720	2,360		Mauritius
Gaseopsan	710	2,330		North Chungcheong Province, South Korea
Mount Dick	705	2,313		Auckland Islands, New Zealand
Pu‘u ‘Ō‘ō	698	2,290		US (Hawaii)
Signal de Botrange	694	2,277	High Fens	Belgium (Liège) – Highest in Belgium
Ishpatina Ridge	690	2,260		Canada (Ontario)
Galgisan	685	2,247		Gyeonggi Province and Gangwon Province, South Korea
Delphi	681	2,234		Greece (Skopelos)
Qalorujoorneq	676	2,218		Greenland
Penas del Chache	672	2,205		Lanzarote, Spain
Lion's Head	669	2,195		Cape Town, South Africa
Steling	658	2,159	High Fens	Belgium
Maple Mountain	642	2,106		Canada (Ontario)
Kinder Scout	636	2,087		Peak District, England – Highest in Peak District
Masaya Volcano	635	2,083		Nicaragua
Mount D'Urville	630	2,070		Auckland Islands, New Zealand
Moel Eilio	629	2,064		Snowdonia, Wales
High Willhays	621	2,037		England (Dartmoor)
Snaefell	621	2,037		Isle of Man, British Isles
Beinn Mhòr	620	2,030		South Uist, Scotland
Mount Bibele	617	2,024		Italy
Munsusan (Ulsan)	600	2,000		Ulsan, South Korea
Mount Takao	599	1,965		Tokyo, Japan
Sikjangsan	596	1,955		Daejeon, South Korea
Forbordsfjellet	590	1,940		Nord-Trøndelag, Norway
Gwanggyosan	582	1,909		Gyeonggi Province, South Korea
Mount Pond	576	1,890		South Shetland Islands
Mount Tabor	575	1,886		Galilee, Israel
Monte Conero	572	1,877		Italy (Ancona)
Gyeryongsan	566	1,857		South Gyeongsang Province, South Korea
Mount Honey	558	1,831		Campbell Islands, New Zealand
Le Morne Brabant	555	1,821		Mauritius
Rempart Mountain (Montagne du Rempart)	545	1,788		Mauritius
Palasip Qaqqaa (Præstefjeldet)	544	1,785		Qeqqata, Greenland
Namamsan	543	1,781		Ulsan, South Korea
Taum Sauk Mountain	540	1,770		Missouri, US
Silver Peak Mountain	539	1,768		Ontario, Canada
Aydos Hill	537	1,762		Istanbul, Turkey
Great Mell Fell	537	1,762	Eastern Fells	England (Cumbria)
Geomdansan (Seongnam)	534.7	1,754		Gyeonggi Province, South Korea
Yeonhwasan	532	1,745		Ulsan, South Korea
Heukseongsan	519	1,703		North Chungcheong Province, South Korea
Avala	511	1,677		Serbia
Little Si	480	1,570	Cascade Range	Washington, US
Mount Ramsay	475	1,558		Antarctica
Mount Keira	462	1,516		New South Wales, Australia - near the city of Wollongong
Blue Mountain	452	1,483		Ontario, Canada
Muryongsan (Ulsan)	452	1,483		Ulsan, South Korea
Dongdaesan (Ulsan)	447	1,467		Ulsan, South Korea
Diamond Hill	442	1,450	Connemara National Park	Ireland
Gibraltar	426	1,398		Gibraltar
Pic Paradis	424	1,391		Saint Martin (France) – Highest point
Havsula	415	1,362		Svalbard, Norway
Storm King Mountain	408	1,339	Hudson Highlands	US (New York)
Gyeyangsan	395	1,296		Incheon, South Korea
Mount Galloway	366	1,201		Antipode Islands, New Zealand
Pawala Valley Ridge	347	1,138		Pitcairn Islands, Pacific Ocean – Highest point
Loughrigg Fell	335	1,099	Central Fells	England (Cumbria)
Mount Kinka (Gifu)	329	1,079		Gifu, Japan
Vaalserberg	321	1,053		Netherlands (Limburg)
Mount Bates	319	1,047		Norfolk Island, Australia
Suur Munamägi	318	1,043		Haanja, Estonia
Gaiziņkalns	312	1,024		Latvia – Highest point in Latvia
Mutla Ridge	306	1,004		Kuwait – Highest point
Aukštojas	293	961		Medininkai, Lithuania
Kruopinė	293	961		Vilnius, Lithuania
Juozapinė	292	958		Vilnius, Lithuania
Morne du Vitet	286	938		Saint Barthélemy (France) – Highest point
Qixia Mountain	286	938		Nanjing, China
Hwajangsan	285	935		Ulsan, South Korea
Potolaka/Putuo Shan	284	932		Zhejiang, China
Agujas Grandes	266	873		La Graciosa, Spain
Jerimoth Hill	247	810		Rhode Island, US
Mount Ngerchelchuus	242	794		Babeldaob, Palau – Highest point
Mount Royal	233	764		Quebec, Canada
Diamond Head	232	761		US (Hawaii)
Yeomposan	203	666		Ulsan, South Korea
Hamwolsan	200	660		Ulsan, South Korea
Sugarloaf Mountain, Massachusetts	196	643		South Deerfield, Massachusetts
Maungawhau / Mount Eden	196	643		Auckland, New Zealand
Jamanota	188	617		Arikok National Park, Aruba
Alto de Coloane	172.4	566		Coloane, Macau
Møllehøj	170.86	560.6		Skanderborg, Denmark

== See also ==
- Lists of highest points
- List of volcanoes by elevation
