= Mont de Gébroulaz =

Mountain in France

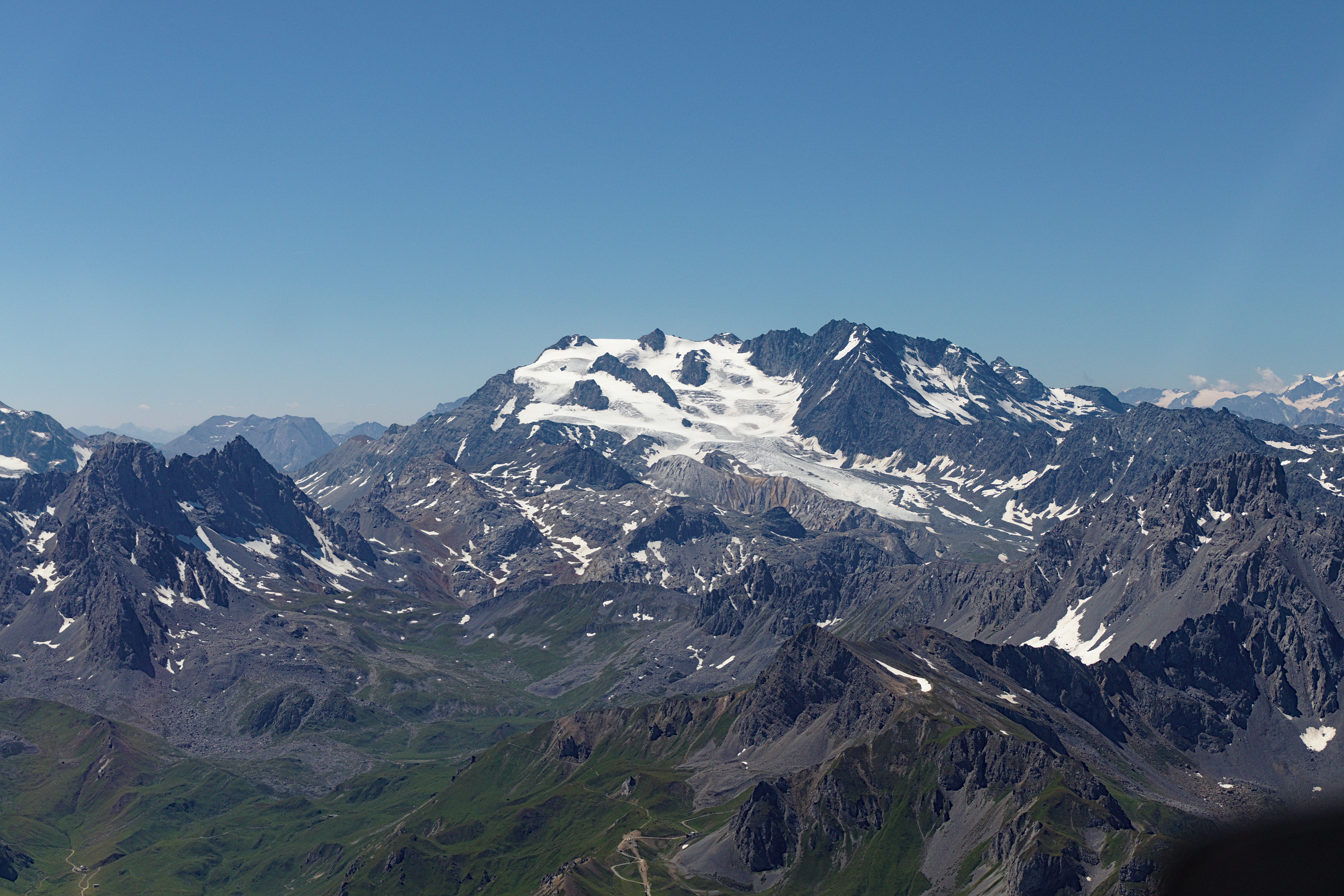
- Aerial view of the mont de Gébroulaz in July 2018.

Highest point
- Elevation: 3,511 m (11,519 ft)
- Prominence: 50 m (160 ft)
- Coordinates: 45°16′29″N 06°37′45″E

Geography
- Location within France
- Location: Savoie, France
- Parent range: Vanoise Massif

Mont de Gébroulaz is a mountain of Savoie, France. It lies in the Massif de la Vanoise range, between Aiguille de Péclet and Aiguille de Polset. It has an elevation of 3,511 metres above sea level.

The toponym "Gébroulaz" is derived from the Gaulish word gabra, meaning a female chamois, together with the diminutive suffix -oulaz. It is a traditional place name (or lieu-dit) of the Méribel area, and is also used in the names of a nearby glacier (Glacier de Gébroulaz) and mountain pass (Col de Gébroulaz).
