= Roc Noir =

Roc Noir (French for "black rock") may refer to:

- Grand Roc Noir, mountain in Switzerland
- a triangular rock formation jutting from the east ridge of Annapurna Massif
