= Dent de Burgin =

Mountain near the Meribel resort in Savoie, France

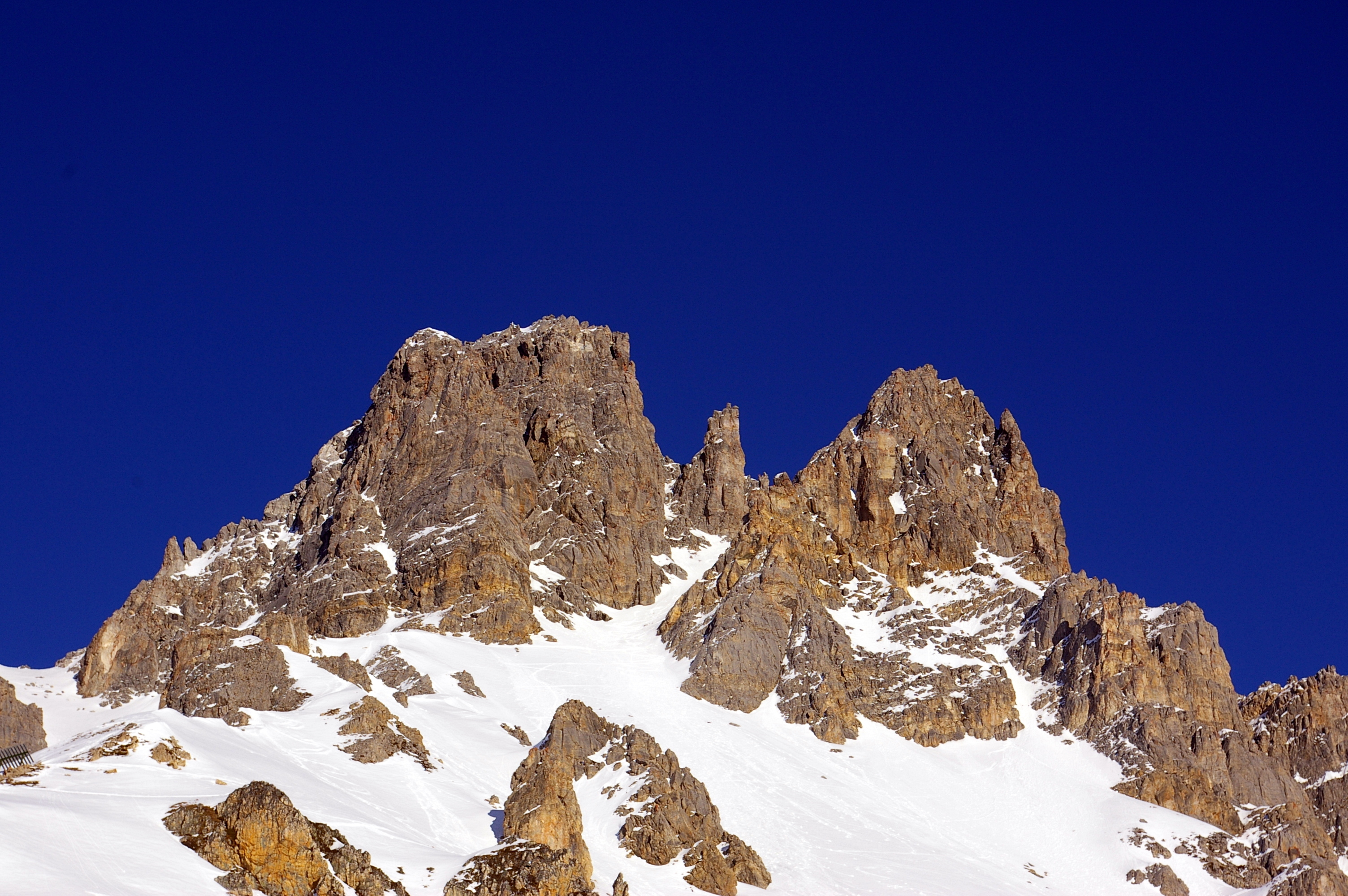

Highest point
- Elevation: 2,739 m (8,986 ft)
- Coordinates: 45.3890°N 6.6062°E

Geography
- Location within France
- Location: Savoie, France
- Parent range: Vanoise Massif

Dent de Burgin is a mountain near the Meribel resort in Savoie, France. It lies in the Vanoise range. It has an altitude of 2739 meters above sea level.
