= Pointe de la Fournache =

Mountain in Savoie, France

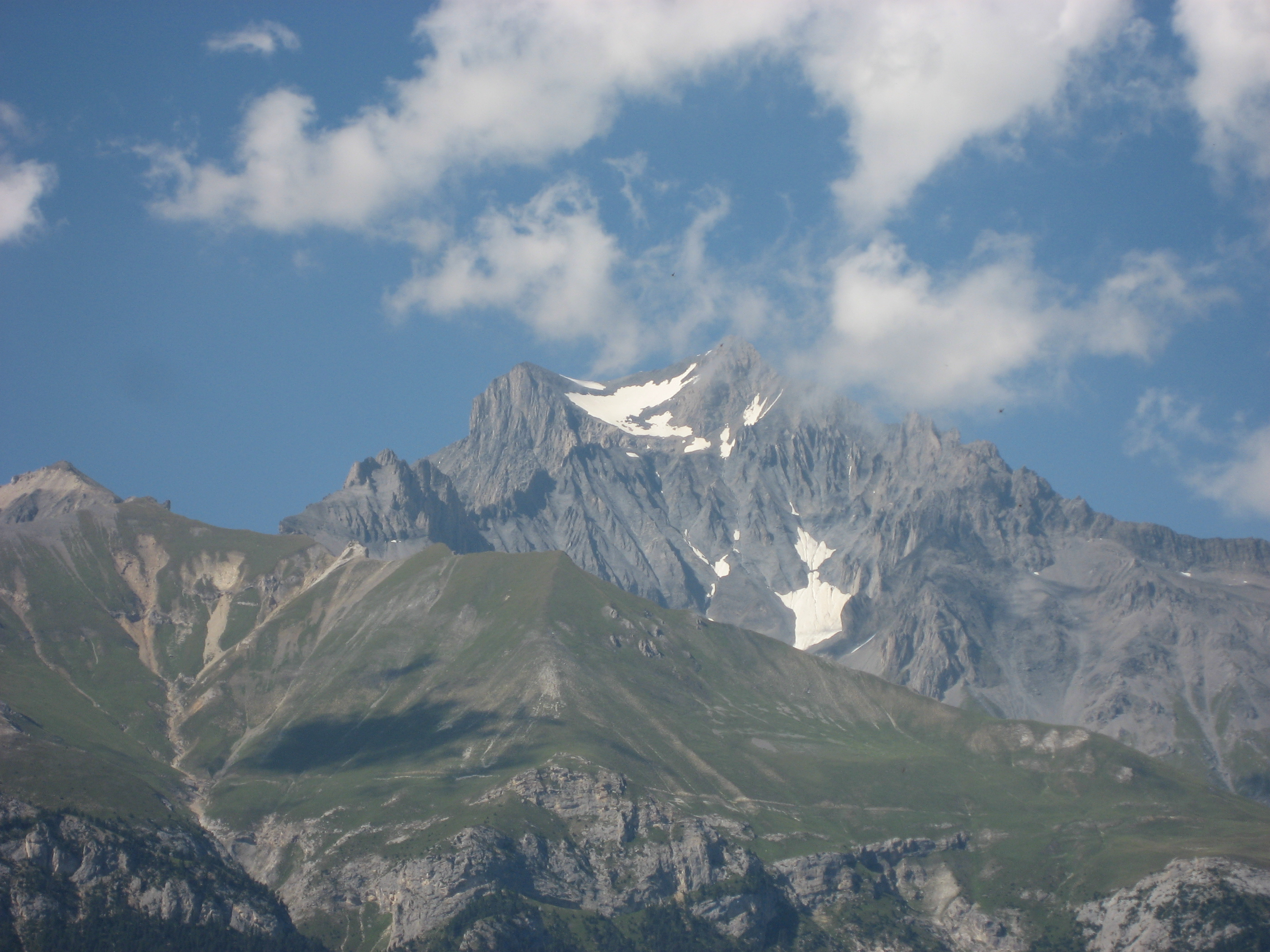
- Southern face of Pointe de la Fournache (left) and Dent Parrachée (right) in the background, separated by a small cirque glacier

Highest point
- Elevation: 3,642 m (11,949 ft)
- Coordinates: 45°17′15″N 06°45′09″E

Geography
- Location within France
- Location: Savoie, France
- Parent range: Vanoise Massif

Geology
- Rock age: Early Jurassic
- Mountain type: limestone

Pointe de la Fournache is a mountain of Savoie, France. It lies in the Massif de la Vanoise range. It has an elevation of 3,642 metres (11,949 ft) above sea level.

Pointe de la Fournache lies north of Aussois and southwest of Dent Parrachée (3,697 metres (12,129 ft)). The summit is very close to Dent Parrachée, which is separated by a short ridge.
