= Aiguille Rouge =

Mountain in France

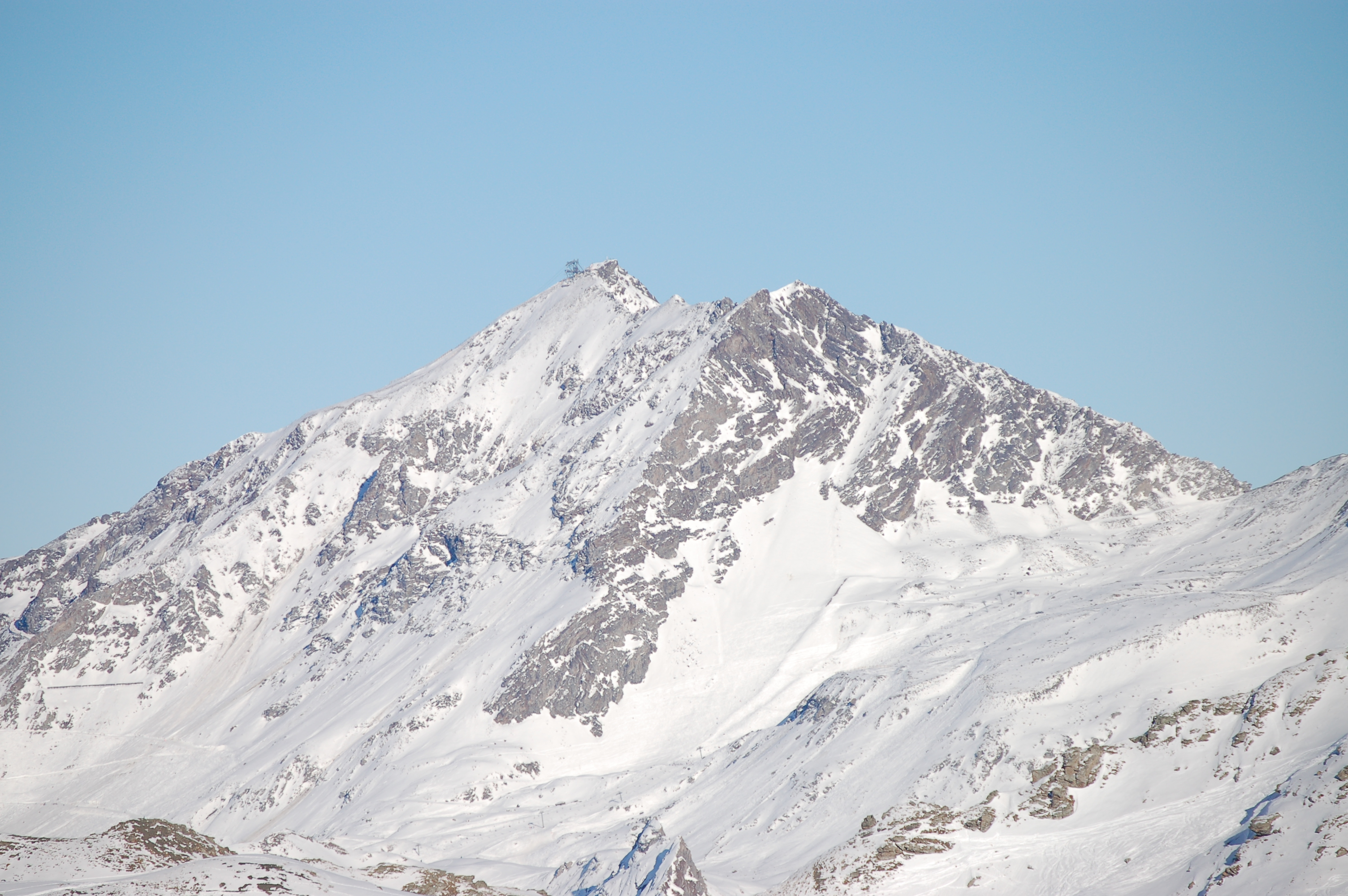
- Aiguille Rouge

Highest point
- Elevation: 3,227 m (10,587 ft)
- Prominence: 292 m (958 ft)
- Isolation: 2.78 km (1.73 mi)
- Coordinates: 45°33′07″N 06°50′55″E

Naming
- English translation: Red Needle
- Language of name: French

Geography
- Location within France
- Location: Savoie, France
- Parent range: Vanoise Massif, Graian Alps

Aiguille Rouge is a mountain of Savoie, France. It lies in the Vanoise Massif and has an elevation of 3,227 metres above sea level. It is the highest point within the ski area of Les Arcs and is a fairly easy hike from the village below. It can also be accessed by a cable-car which almost reaches the summit area. In 2019 a footbridge was installed at the summit that offers a panoramic view of the valley.

== Skiing ==
=== Marked Runs ===
Aiguille Rouge hosts a variety of on and off-piste ski routes accessible via the Aiguille Rouge cable-car, as seen on the Les Arcs terrain map. Recently, the recession of the Glacier Du Varet has caused all of the marked runs on Aiguille Rouge to be upgraded to a black difficulty rating to match the increased run angles caused by the recession.

=== Unmarked Runs/Off-Piste ===
14 ungroomed, unmarked runs are highlighted and described in the off-piste guide Les clés de Paradiski: les plus beaux hors-pistes by Didier Givois, 5 on the West side and 9 on the East side of the mountain. Of the 5 on the West side, one route, Les Câbles, is directly under the cable car. The rest of the runs on the East side of the mountain lead to Villaroger, where the gondola allows skiers to re-enter the main resort area.

== Gallery ==
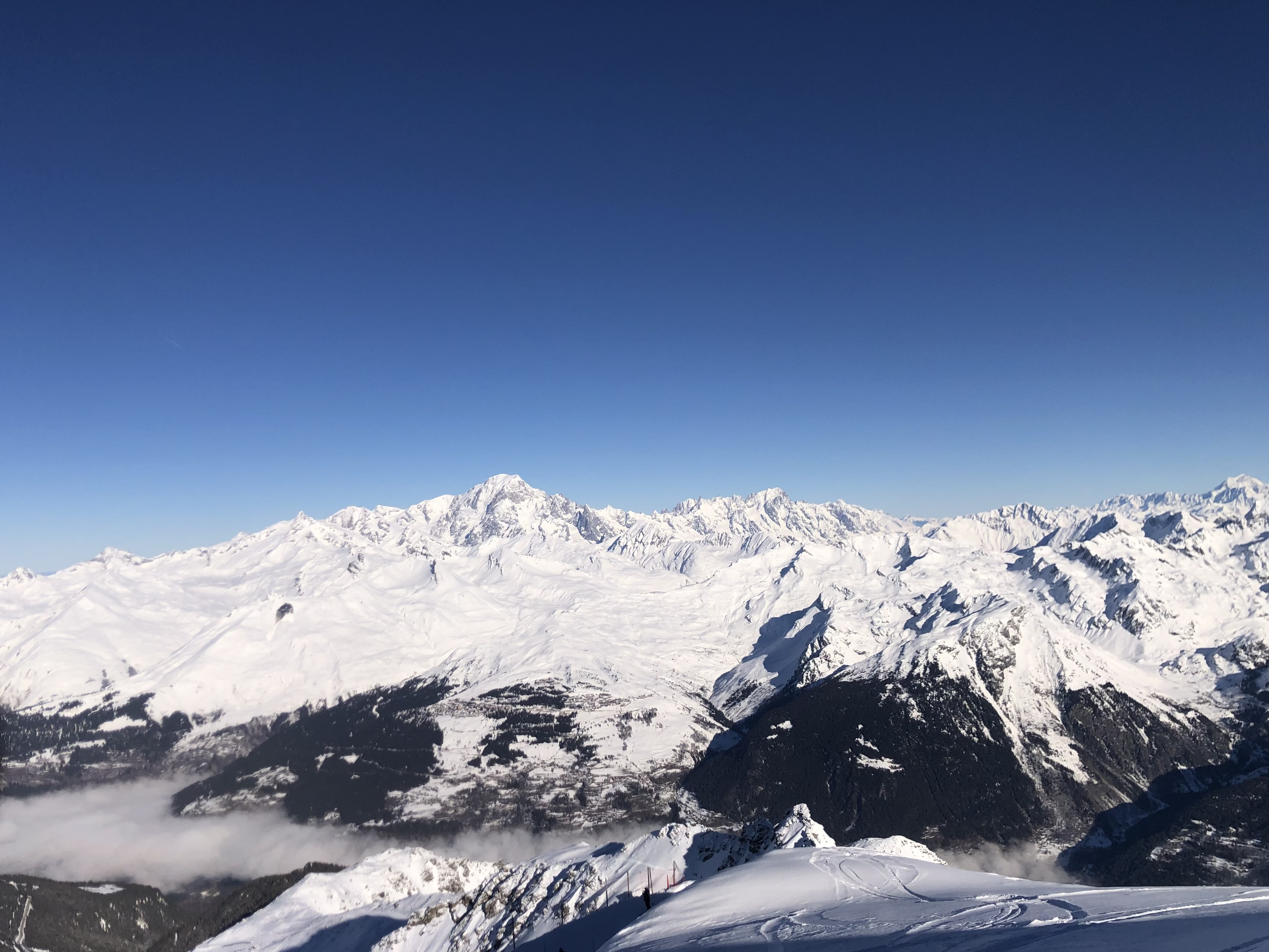
View of the southern side of Mont Blanc (the big summit on the left) from Aiguille Rouge

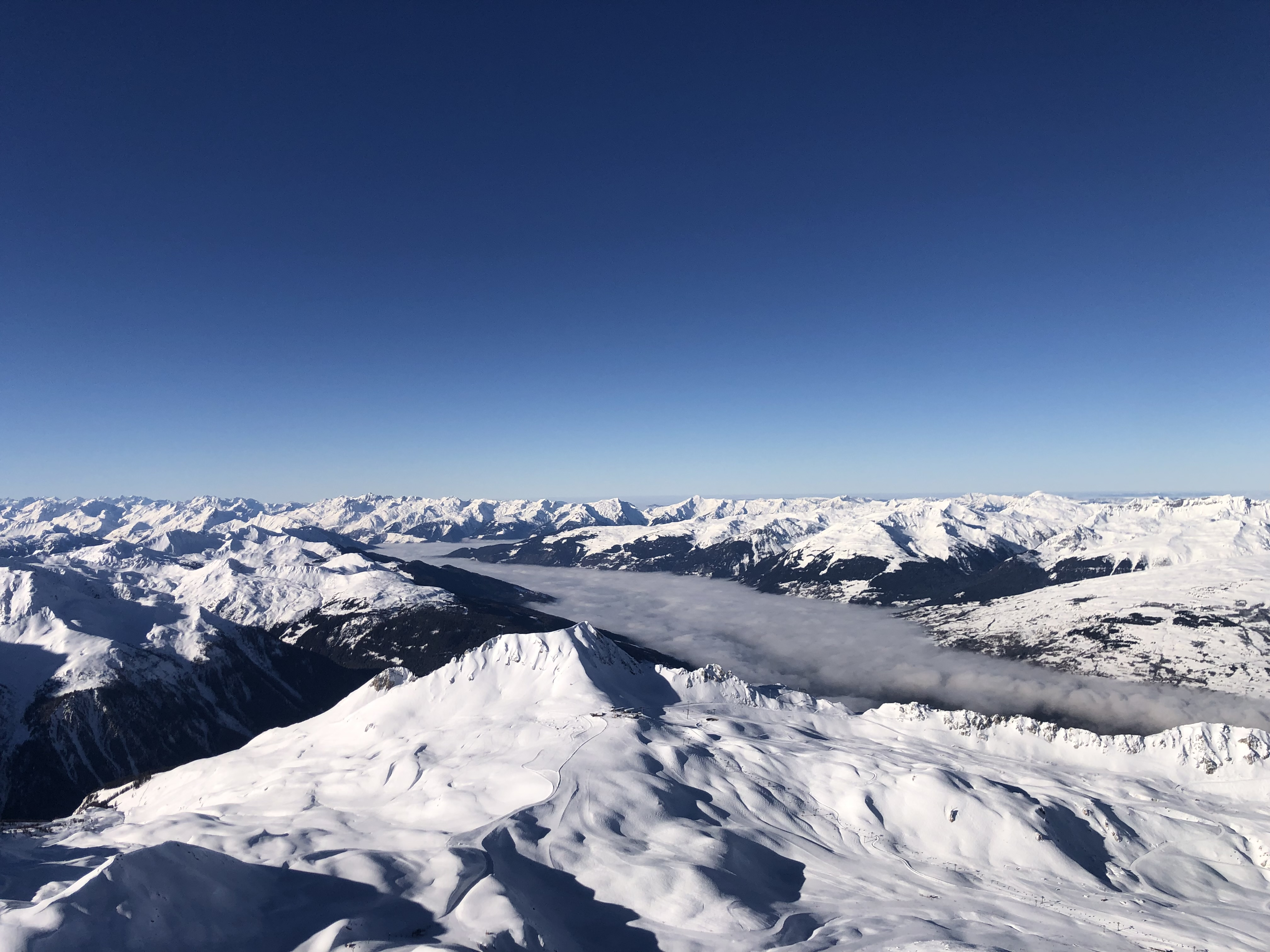
View of Landry valley from Aiguille Rouge
