= Mont du Borgne =

Mountain in Savoie, France

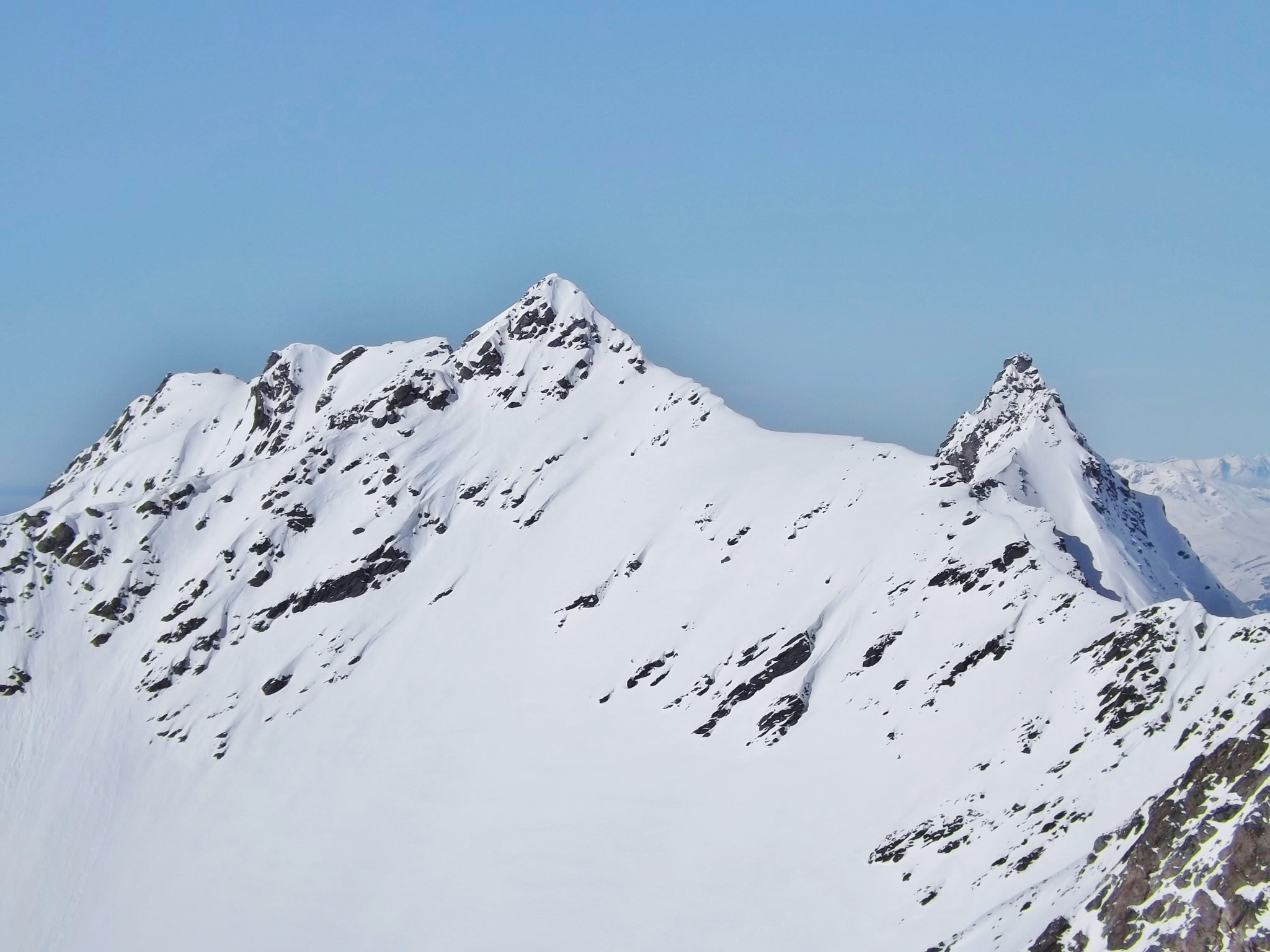

Highest point
- Elevation: 3,153 m (10,344 ft)
- Coordinates: 45°18′14″N 06°36′48″E

Geography
- Location within France
- Location: Savoie, France
- Parent range: Vanoise Massif

Mont du Borgne is a mountain in Savoie, France. It lies in the Massif de la Vanoise range. It has an elevation of 3,153 metres above sea level.
