= Mont Turia =

Shoulder on north ridge of Mount Pourri in Savoie, France

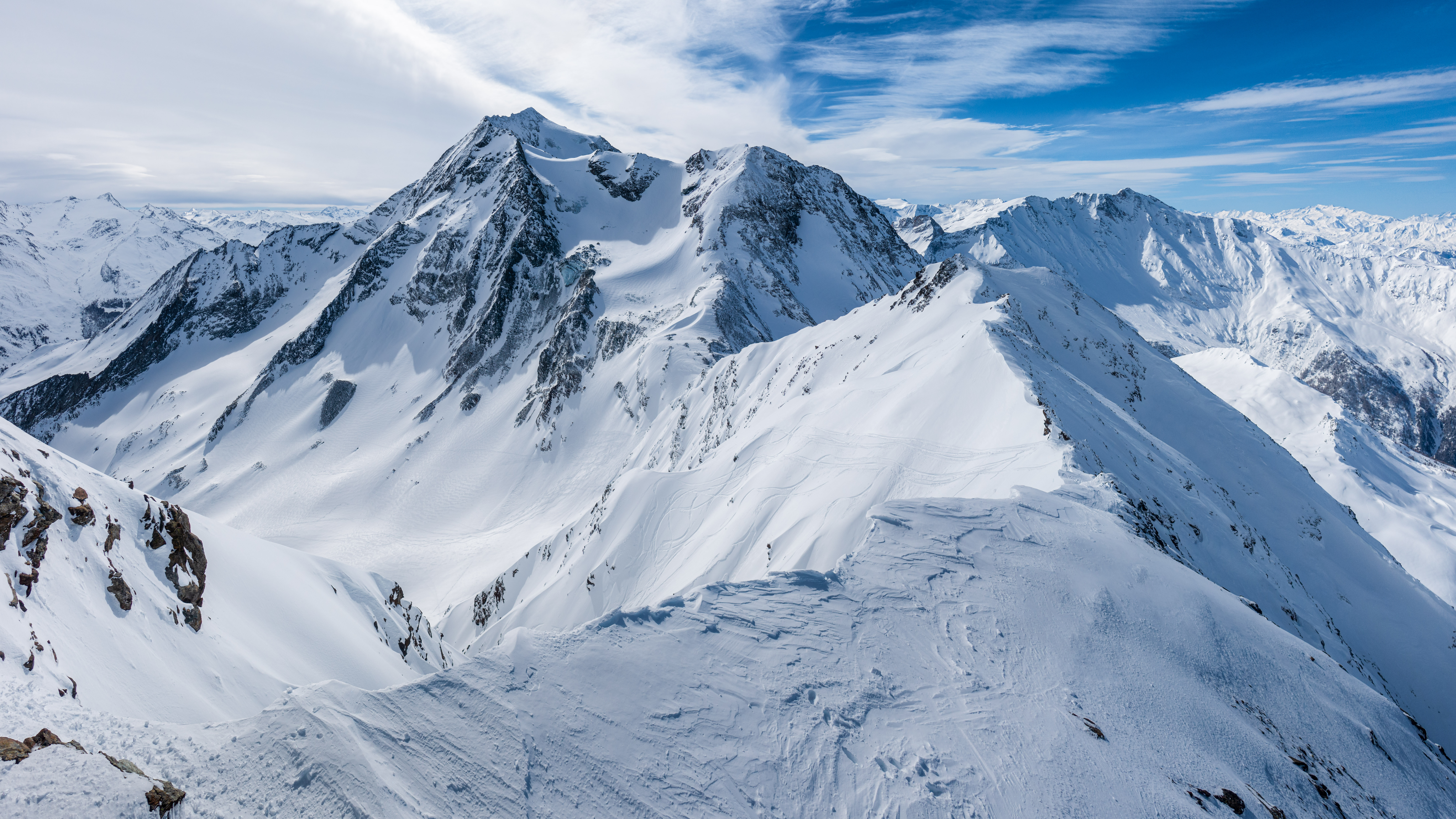
- View from the north on the west ridge leading off Mont Turia. From left to right Mont Turia, Mont Pourri (in the back), Col des Roches (3,435 m), and Aiguille du St-Esprit (3,414 m).

Highest point
- Elevation: 3,646 m (11,962 ft)
- Prominence: 3 m (9.8 ft)
- Coordinates: 45°31′57″N 06°51′38″E

Geography
- Location within France
- Location: Savoie, France
- Parent range: Vanoise Massif

Mont Turia is a shoulder on the north ridge of Mont Pourri in Savoie, France. It lies in the Massif de la Vanoise range. It has an elevation of 3,646 metres above sea level.
