= Dôme de l'Arpont =

Mountain in Italy

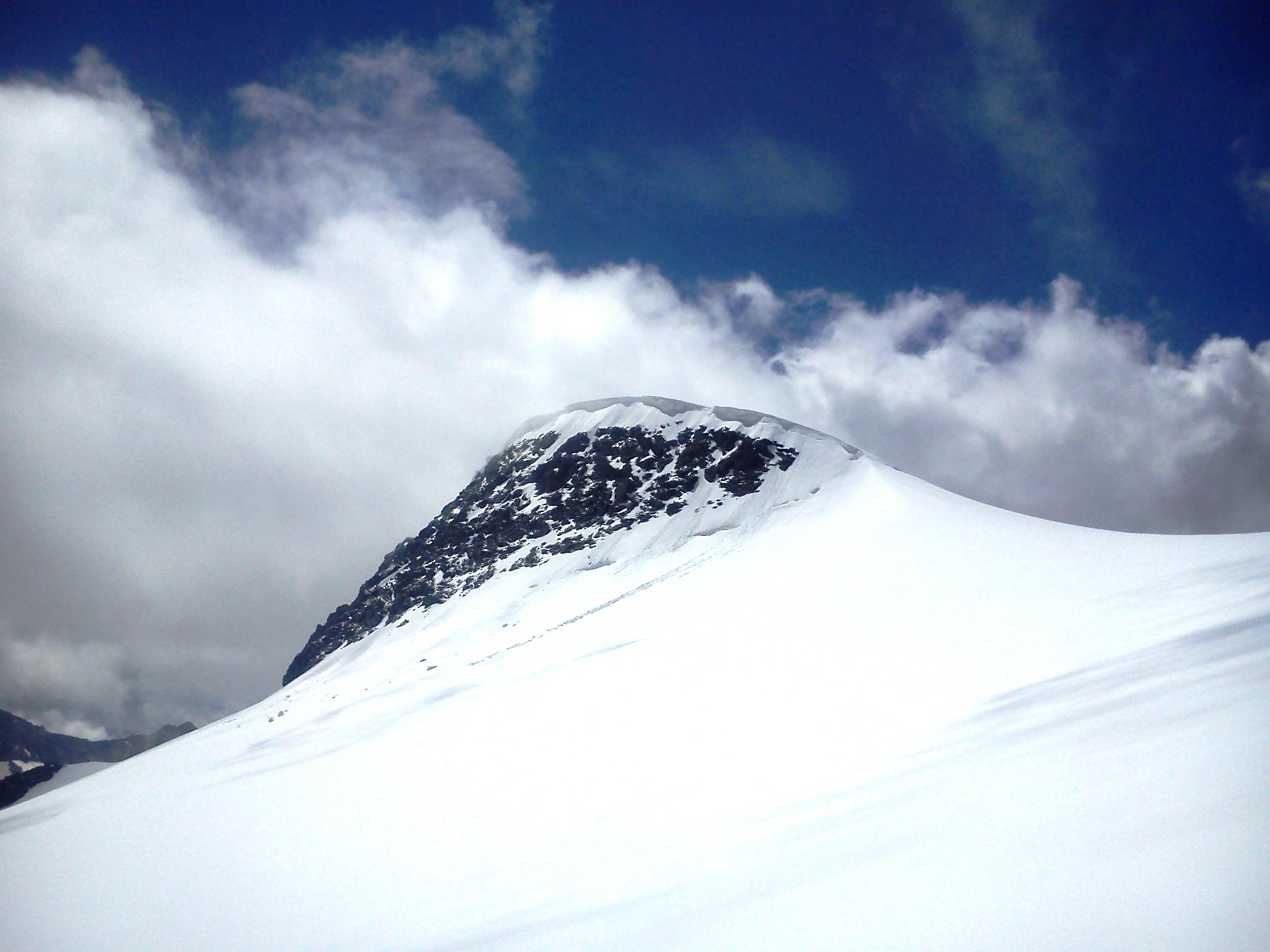
- The Dome de I'Arpont

Highest point
- Elevation: 3,601 m (11,814 ft)
- Prominence: 275 m (902 ft)
- Coordinates: 45°19′07″N 06°44′34″E

Geography
- Location within France
- Location: Savoie, France
- Parent range: Massif de la Vanoise

Dôme de l'Arpont is a mountain of Savoie, France. It lies in the Massif de la Vanoise range. It has an elevation of 3,601 metres above sea level.
