= Pointe de la Réchasse =

Mountain in Savoie, France

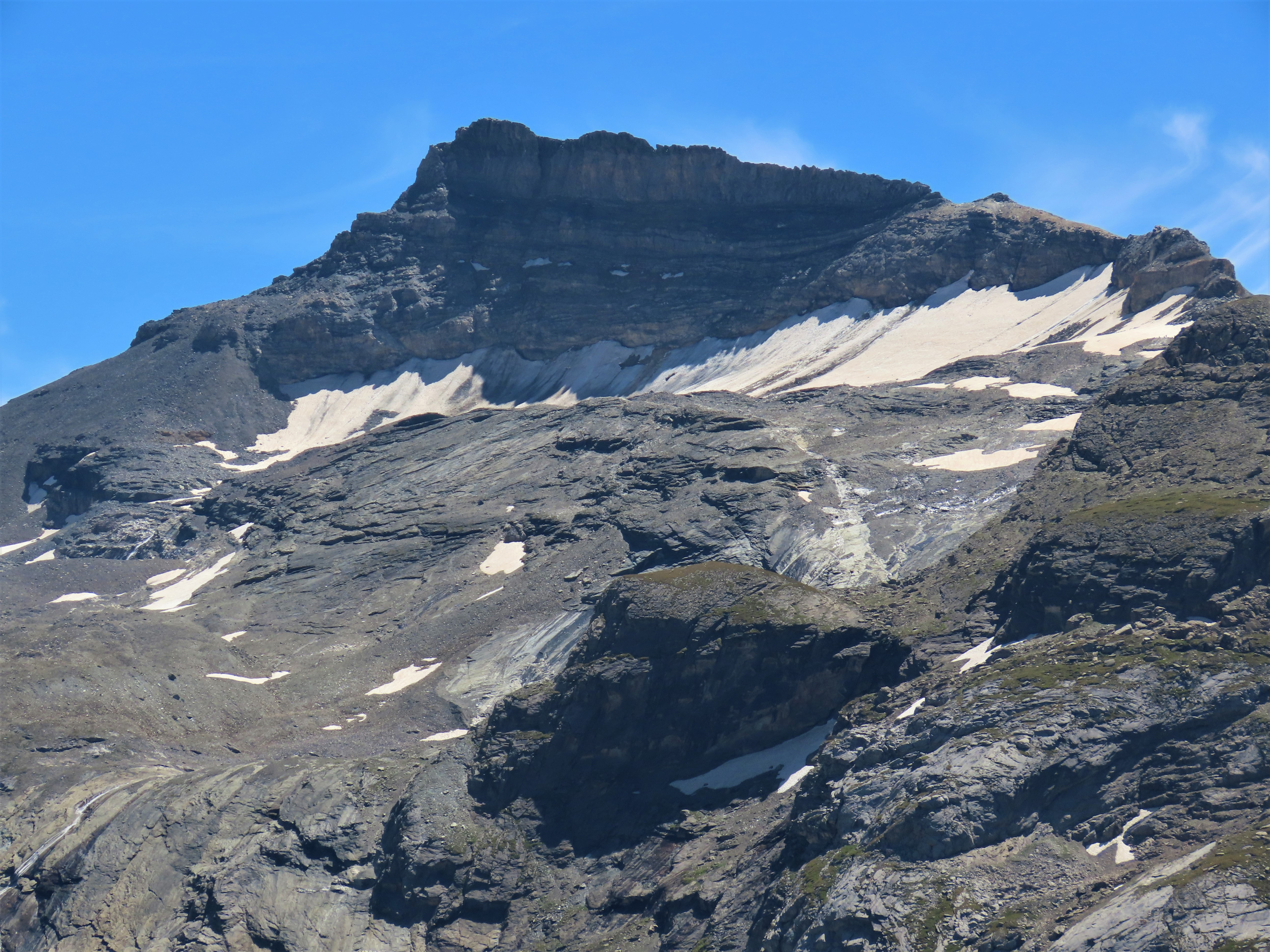

Highest point
- Elevation: 3,212 m (10,538 ft)
- Prominence: 208 m (682 ft)
- Coordinates: 45°22′24″N 06°48′07″E

Geography
- Location within France
- Location: Savoie, France
- Parent range: Vanoise Massif

Pointe de la Réchasse is a mountain of Savoie, France. It lies in the Massif de la Vanoise range. It has an elevation of 3,212 metres above sea level.
