= Roche Chevrière =

Mountain in Savoie, France

- Location within France

Highest point
- Elevation: 3,281 m (10,764 ft)
- Prominence: 11 m (36 ft)
- Coordinates: 45°17′36″N 06°43′19″E

Geography
- Location: Savoie, France
- Parent range: Vanoise Massif

Roche Chevrière is a mountain of Savoie, France. It lies in the Massif de la Vanoise range. It has an elevation of 3,281 metres above sea level.
