= Sommet de la Saulire =

Mountain in France

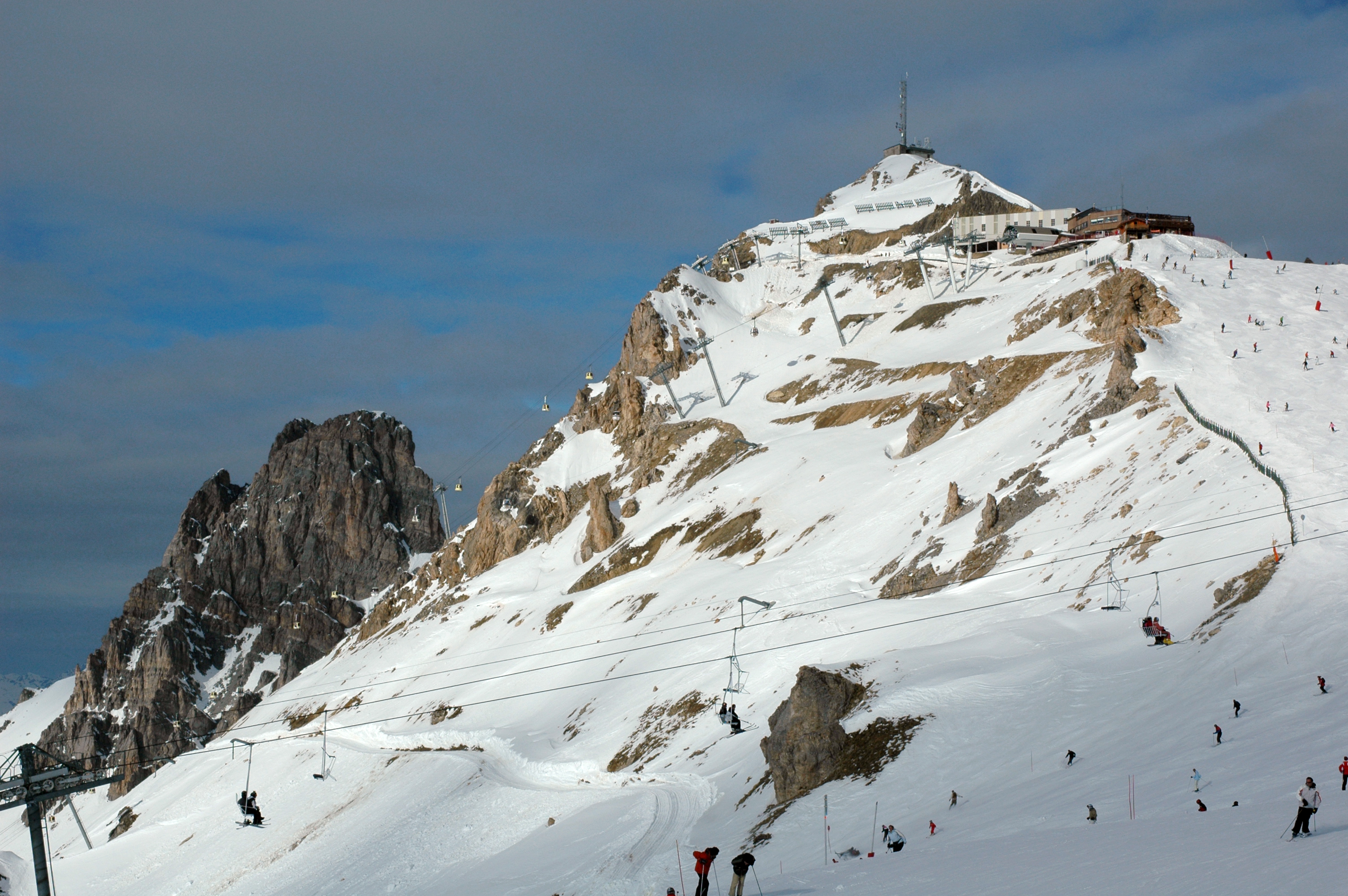

Highest point
- Elevation: 2,738 m (8,983 ft)
- Coordinates: 45°23′00″N 06°36′38″E

Geography
- Location within France
- Location: Savoie, France
- Parent range: Vanoise Massif

Sommet de la Saulire is a mountain in Savoie, France. It lies in the Massif de la Vanoise range. It has an elevation of 2,738 metres above sea level. In the winter, it is used for skiing, and is located between the two towns, Courchevel and Meribel. These two towns are towns in the three valleys, which is a popular ski resort in the French alps. The mountain has slopes that go to Courchevel, and slopes that go to Meribel.
