= Mont Brequin =

Mountain in Savoie, France

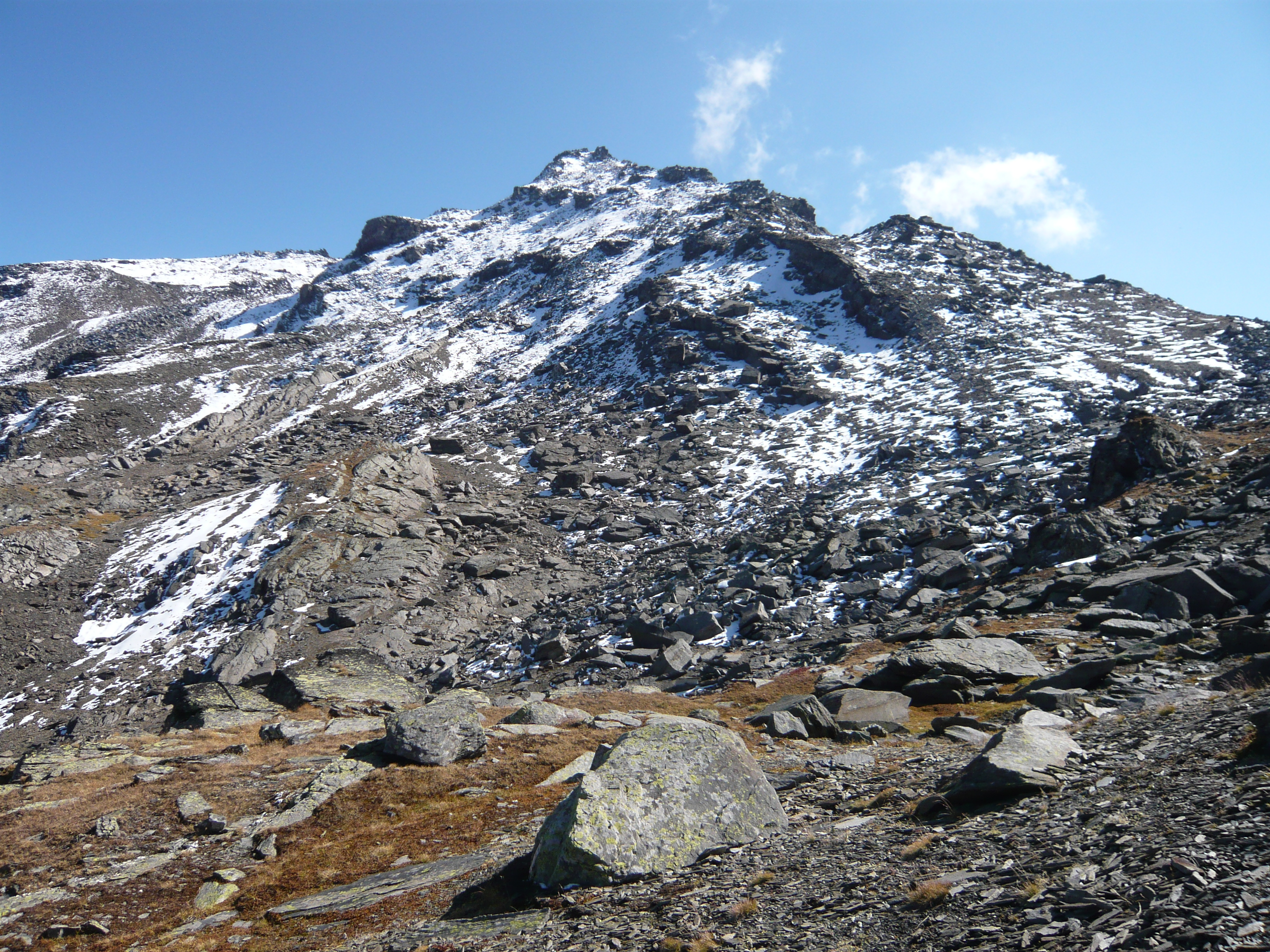

Highest point
- Elevation: 3,130 m (10,270 ft)
- Prominence: 154 m (505 ft)
- Coordinates: 45°15′06″N 06°32′01″E

Geography
- Location within France
- Location: Savoie, France
- Parent range: Vanoise Massif

Mont Brequin is a mountain of Savoie, France. It lies in the Massif de la Vanoise range. It has an elevation of 3,130 metres above sea level.
