= Dôme de Chasseforêt =

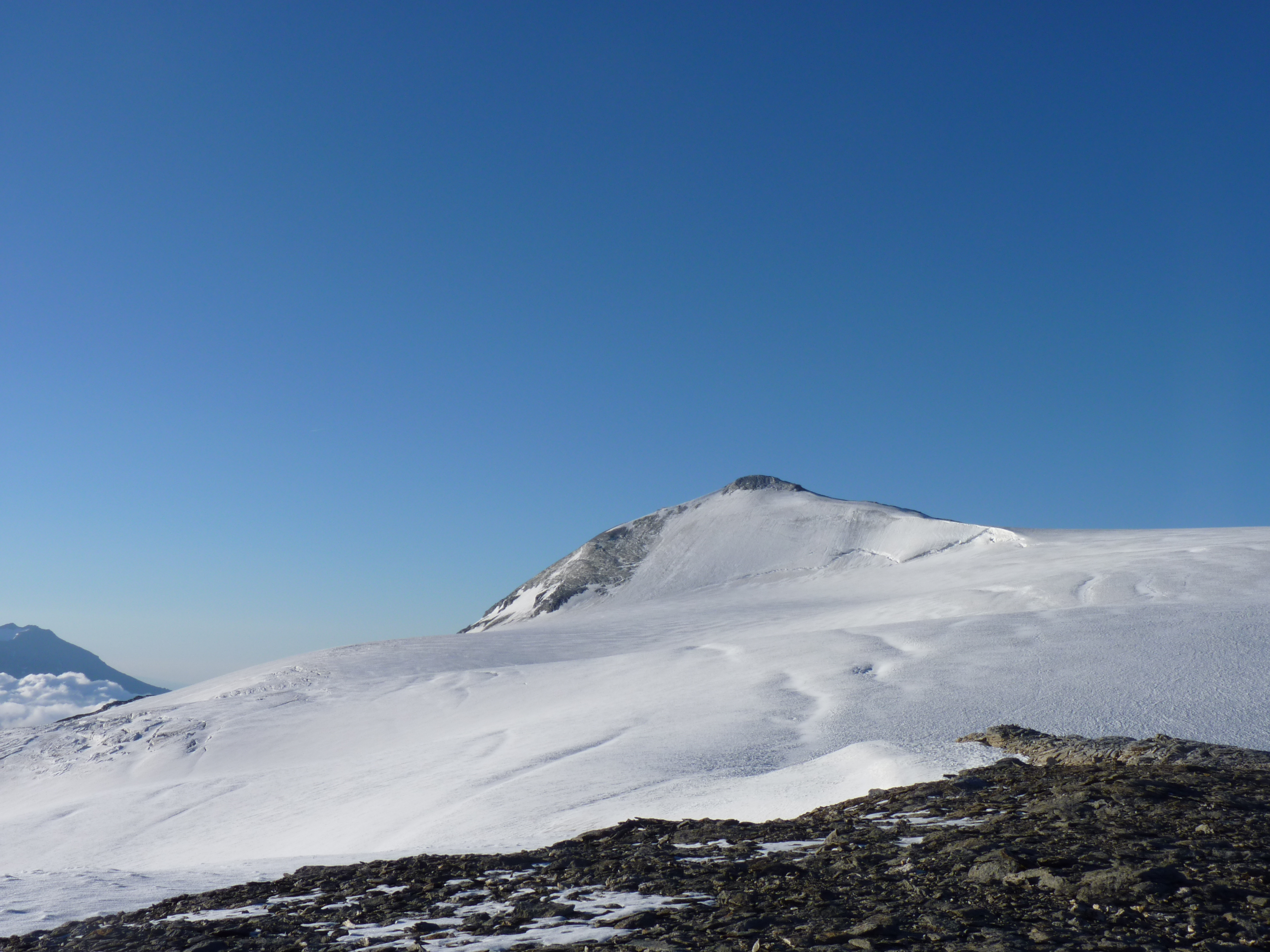

Highest point
- Elevation: 3,586 m (11,765 ft)
- Prominence: 86 m (282 ft)
- Coordinates: 45°19′50″N 06°45′38″E

Geography
- Location within France
- Location: Savoie, France
- Parent range: Massif de la Vanoise

Dôme de Chasseforêt is a mountain of Savoie, France. It lies in the Massif de la Vanoise range. It has an elevation of 3,586 metres above sea level.
