= Pointe du Dard =

Mountain in Savoie, France

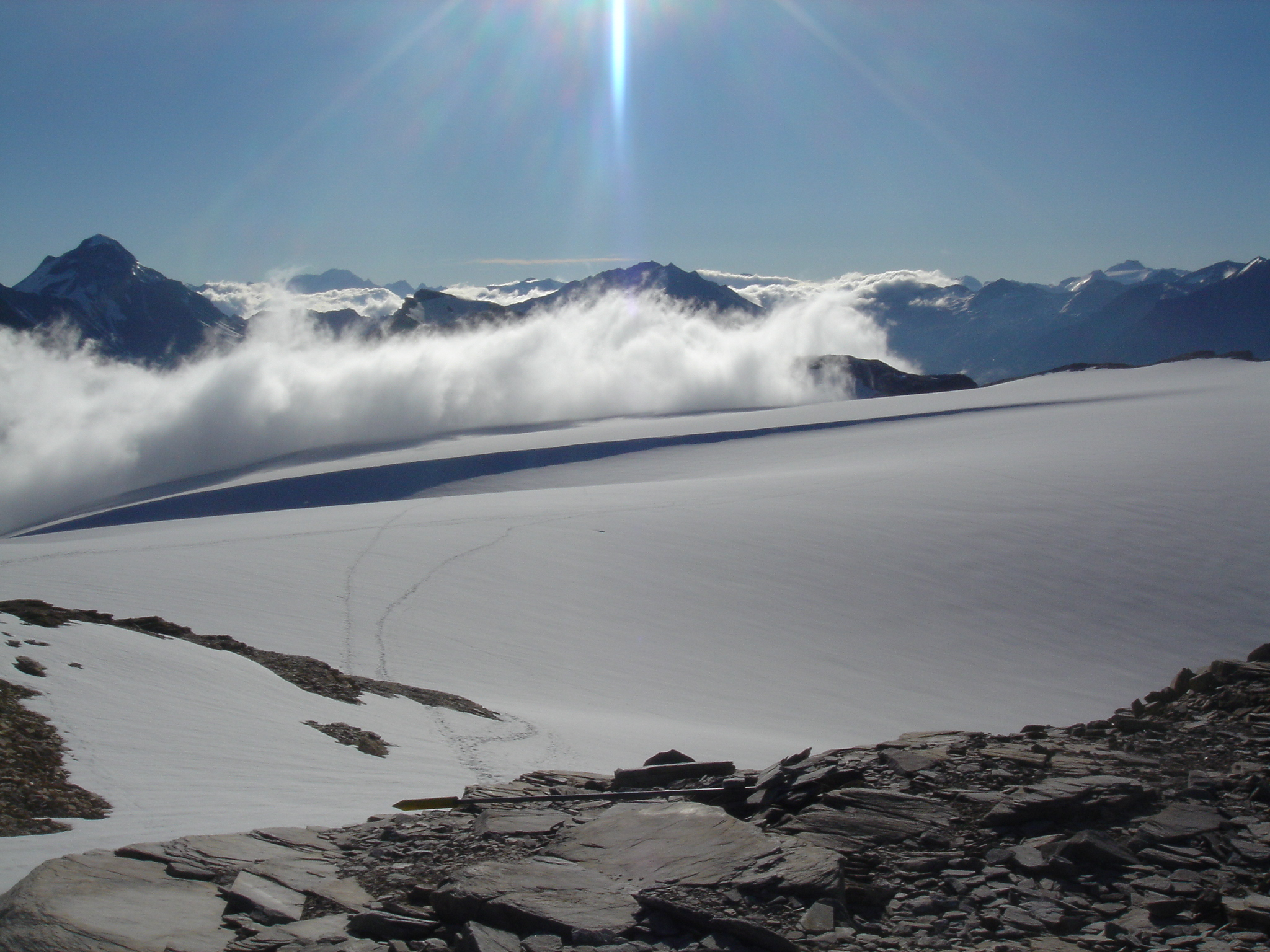

Highest point
- Elevation: 3,206 m (10,518 ft)
- Coordinates: 45°21′50″N 06°45′56″E

Geography
- Location within France
- Location: Savoie, France
- Parent range: Vanoise Massif

Pointe du Dard is a mountain of Savoie, France. It lies in the Massif de la Vanoise range and currently has an elevation of 3,206 metres above sea level.
