= Dôme des Sonnailles =

- Location within France

Highest point
- Elevation: 3,361 m (11,027 ft)
- Coordinates: 45°20′45″N 06°44′44″E

Geography
- Location: Savoie, France
- Parent range: Vanoise Massif

Dôme des Sonnailles is a mountain of Savoie, France. It lies in the Massif de la Vanoise range. It has an elevation of 3,361 metres above sea level.
