= Dôme de la Sache =

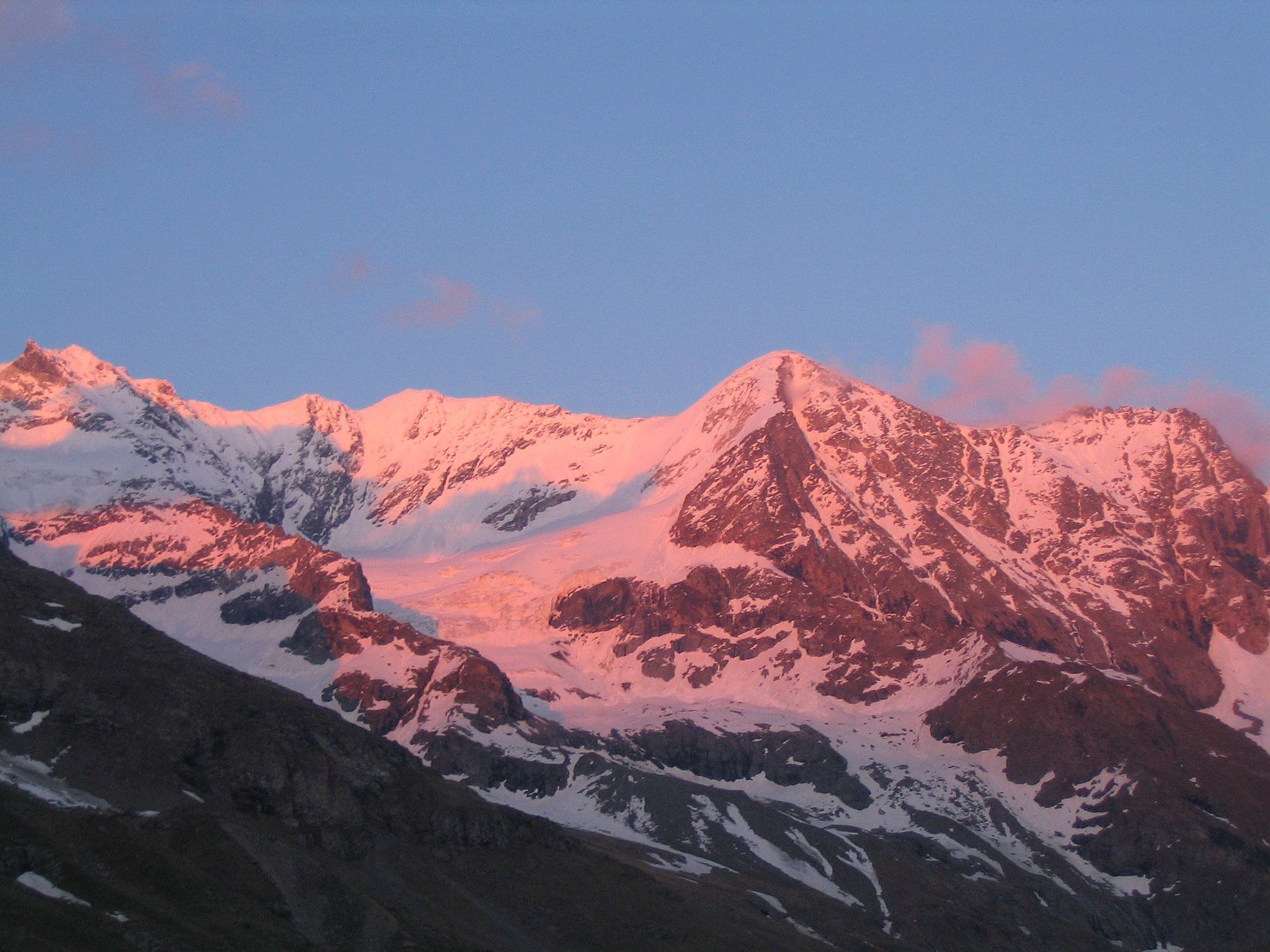

Highest point
- Elevation: 3,601 m (11,814 ft)
- Prominence: 128 m (420 ft)
- Coordinates: 45°30′40″N 06°52′14″E

Geography
- Location within France
- Location: Savoie, France
- Parent range: Massif de la Vanoise

Dôme de la Sache is a mountain of Savoie, France. It lies in the Massif de la Vanoise range. It has an elevation of 3,601 metres above sea level.
