= Grand Bec =

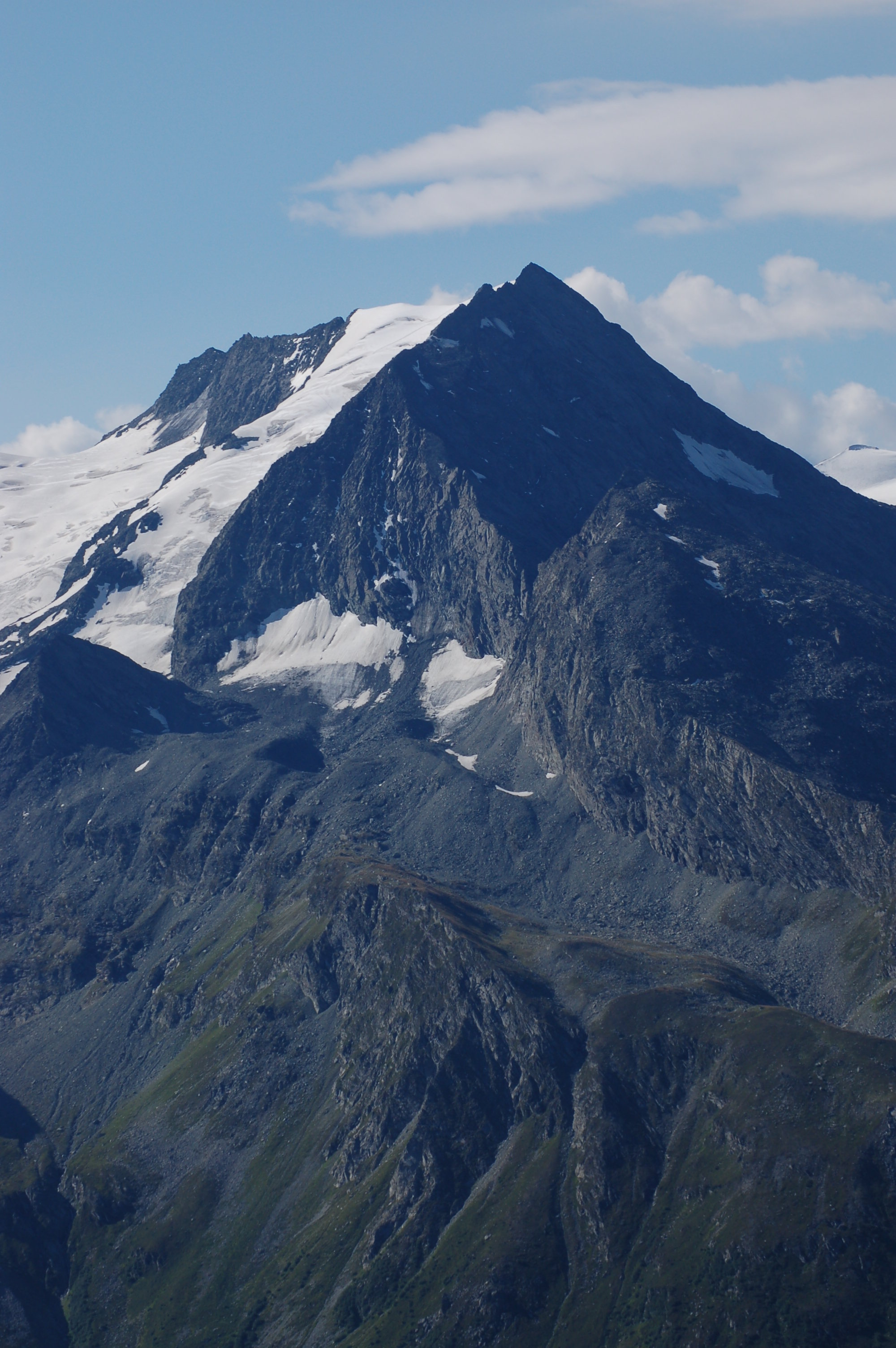

Highest point
- Elevation: 3,398 m (11,148 ft)
- Prominence: 292 m (958 ft)
- Coordinates: 45°25′25″N 06°45′10″E

Geography
- Location within France
- Location: Savoie, France
- Parent range: Vanoise Massif

Grand Bec is a mountain of Savoie, France. It lies in the Massif de la Vanoise range. It has an elevation of 3,398 metres above sea level.
