= Pointe du Vallonnet =

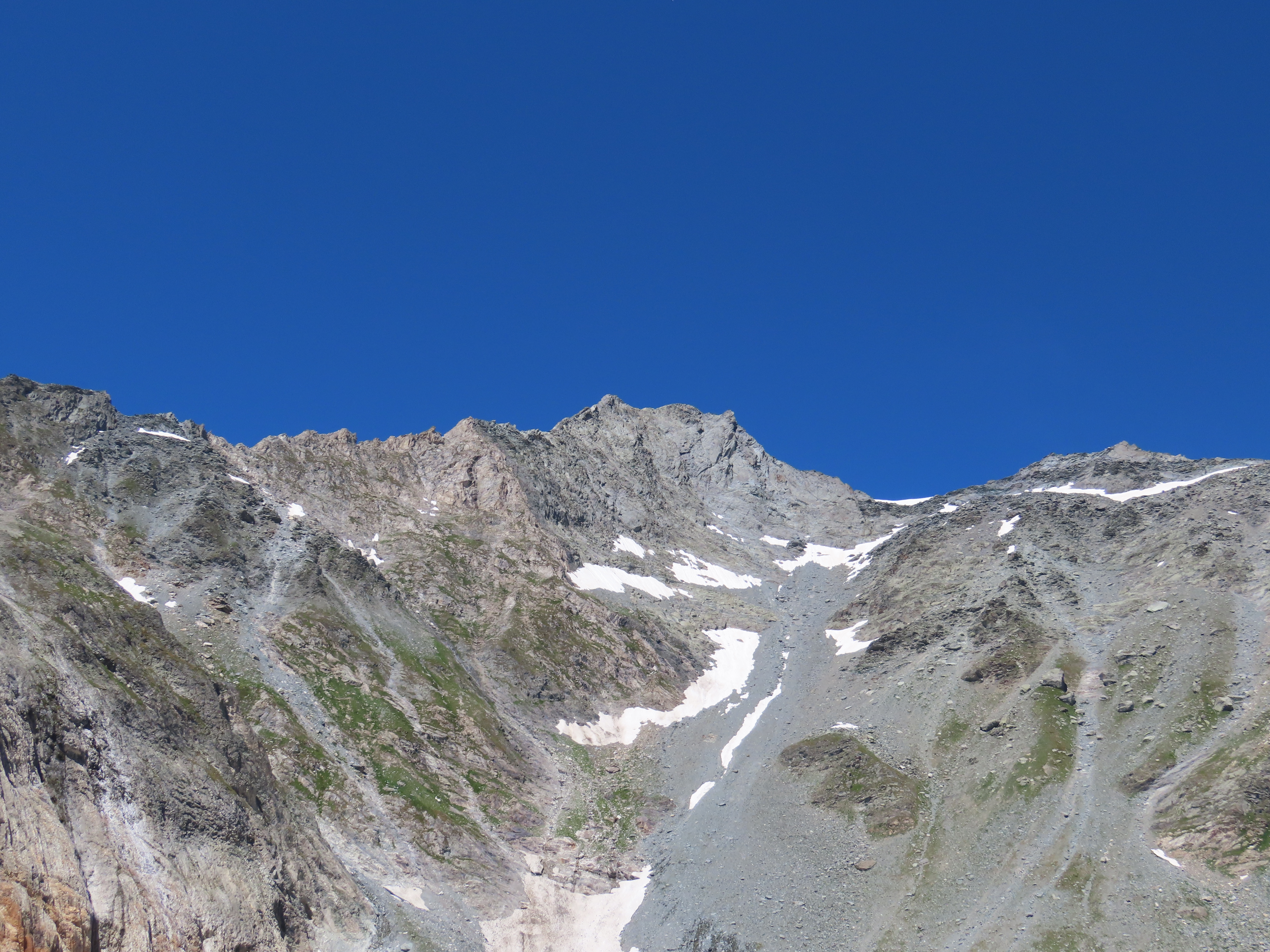

Highest point
- Elevation: 3,372 m (11,063 ft)
- Coordinates: 45°25′02″N 06°45′39″E

Geography
- Location within France
- Location: Savoie, France
- Parent range: Vanoise Massif

Pointe du Vallonnet is a mountain of Savoie, France, close to the Italian border. It lies in the Massif de la Vanoise range, and is part of the French Alps. It has an elevation of 3,372 meters (11,060 feet) above sea level.
