= Pointe de l'Échelle =

Mountain in Italy

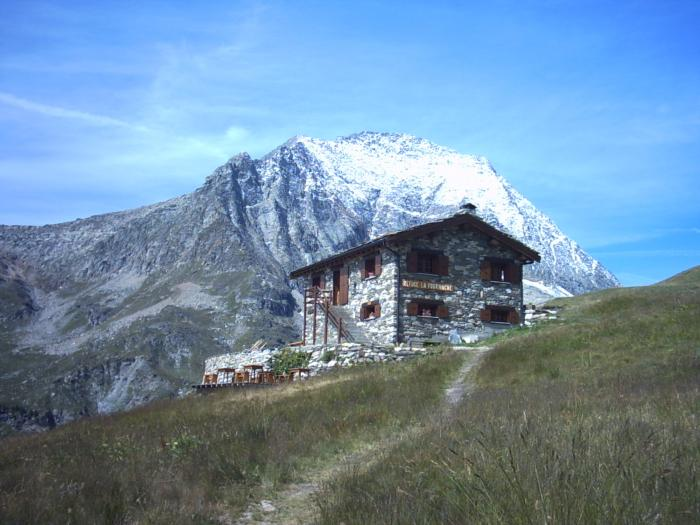

Highest point
- Elevation: 3,422 m (11,227 ft)
- Prominence: 548 m (1,798 ft)
- Listing: Alpine mountains above 3000 m
- Coordinates: 45°16′09″N 06°41′06″E

Geography
- Location within France
- Location: Savoie, France
- Parent range: Vanoise Massif

The Pointe de l'Échelle (3,442 m) is a mountain in the Vanoise Massif in Savoie, France.
