= Dôme des Nants =

- Location within France

Highest point
- Elevation: 3,570 m (11,710 ft)
- Prominence: 61 m (200 ft)
- Coordinates: 45°19′35″N 06°44′29″E

Geography
- Location: Savoie, France
- Parent range: Massif de la Vanoise

Dôme des Nants is a mountain of Savoie, France. It lies in the Massif de la Vanoise range. It has an elevation of 3,570 metres above sea level.
