= Roc des Saints Pères =

Mountain in Savoie, France

- Location within France

Highest point
- Elevation: 3,470 m (11,380 ft)
- Prominence: 21 m (69 ft)
- Coordinates: 45°16′44″N 06°36′57″E

Geography
- Location: Savoie, France
- Parent range: Vanoise Massif

Roc des Saints Pères is a mountain of Savoie, France. It lies in the Massif de la Vanoise range. It has an elevation of 3,470 metres above sea level.
