= Croix des Têtes =

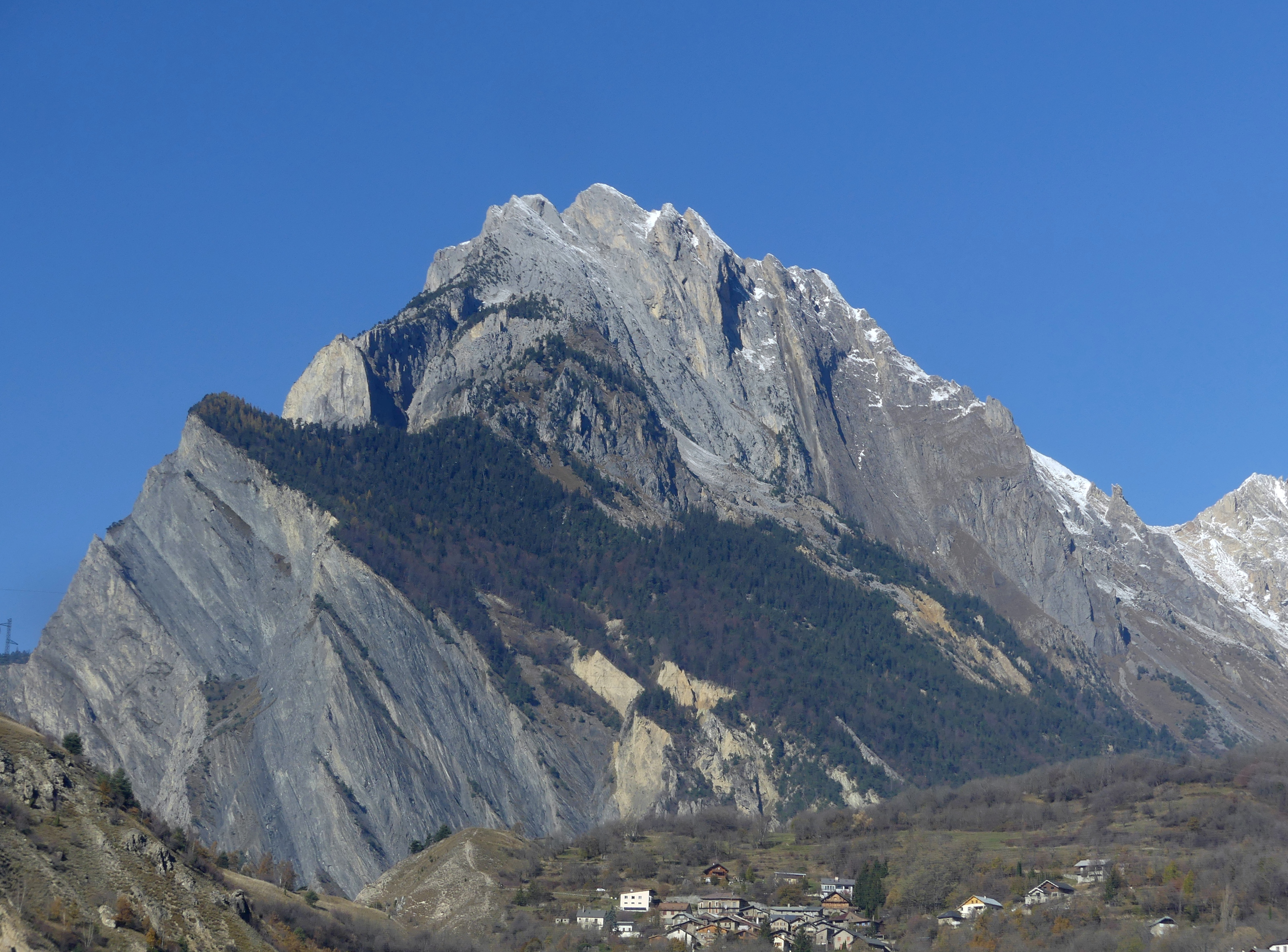

Highest point
- Elevation: 2,492 m (8,176 ft)
- Coordinates: 45°16′01″N 06°26′33″E

Geography
- Location within France
- Location: Savoie, France
- Parent range: Massif de la Vanoise

Croix des Têtes is a mountain of Savoie, France. It lies in the Massif de la Vanoise range. It has an elevation of 2,492 metres above sea level.
