= Pointe de Thorens =

Mountain in Savoie, France

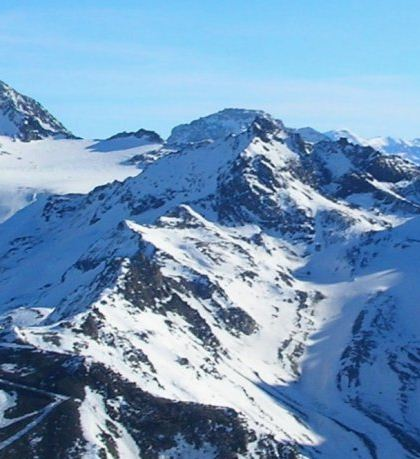

Highest point
- Elevation: 3,266 m (10,715 ft)
- Prominence: 132 m (433 ft)
- Coordinates: 45°15′53″N 06°36′34″E

Geography
- Location within France
- Location: Savoie, France
- Parent range: Massif de la Vanoise

Pointe de Thorens is a mountain of Savoie, France. It lies in the Massif de la Vanoise range. It has an elevation of 3,266 metres above sea level.
