= Mont Pelve =

Mountain in France

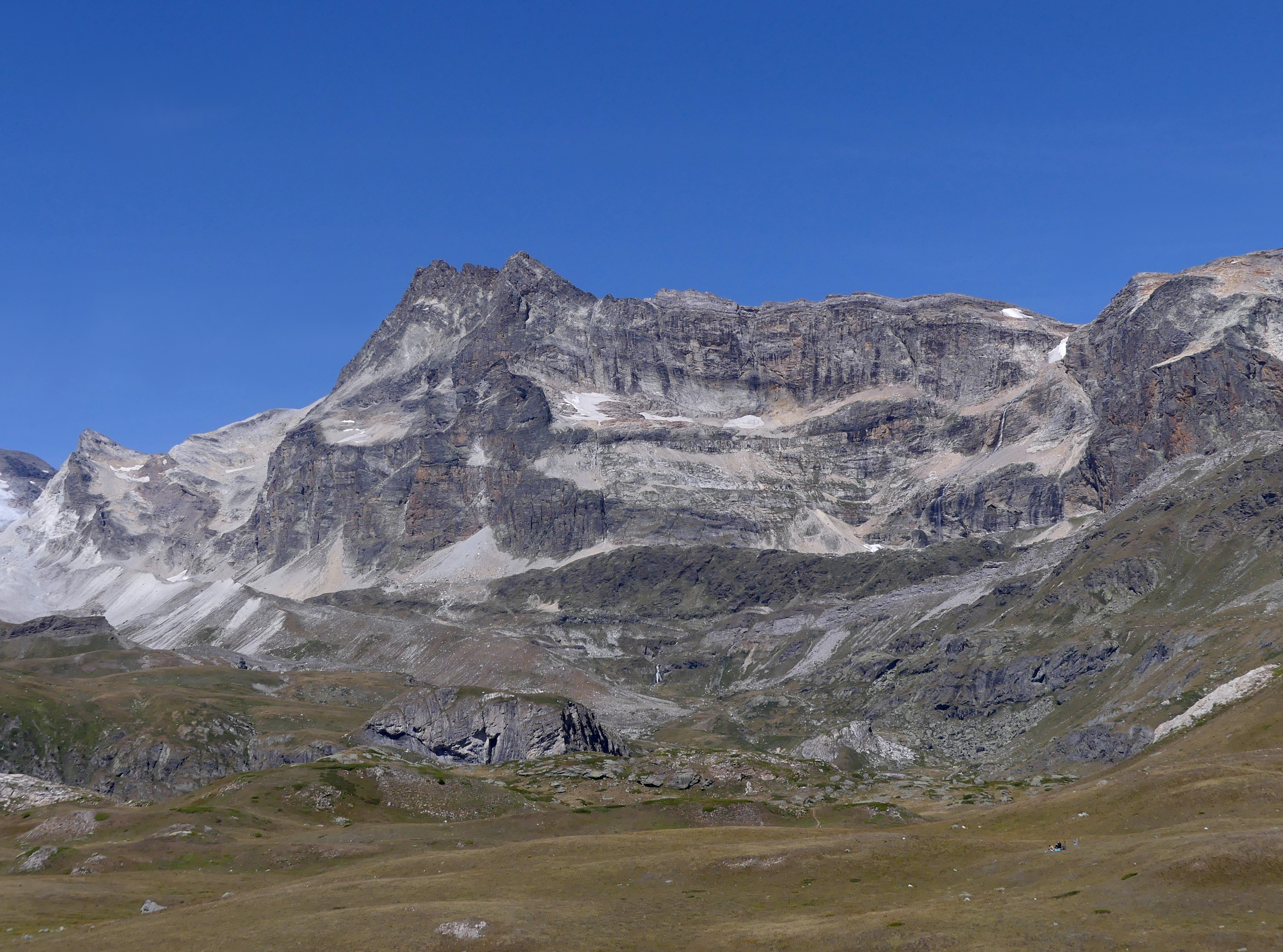

Highest point
- Elevation: 3,261 m (10,699 ft)
- Listing: Alpine mountains above 3000 m
- Coordinates: 45°21′24″N 06°46′53″E

Geography
- Location within France
- Location: Savoie, France
- Parent range: Vanoise Massif

Mont Pelve is a mountain of Savoie, France. It lies in the Massif de la Vanoise range. It has an elevation of 3,261 metres above sea level.
