= Pointe de Claret =

Mountain in Savoie, France

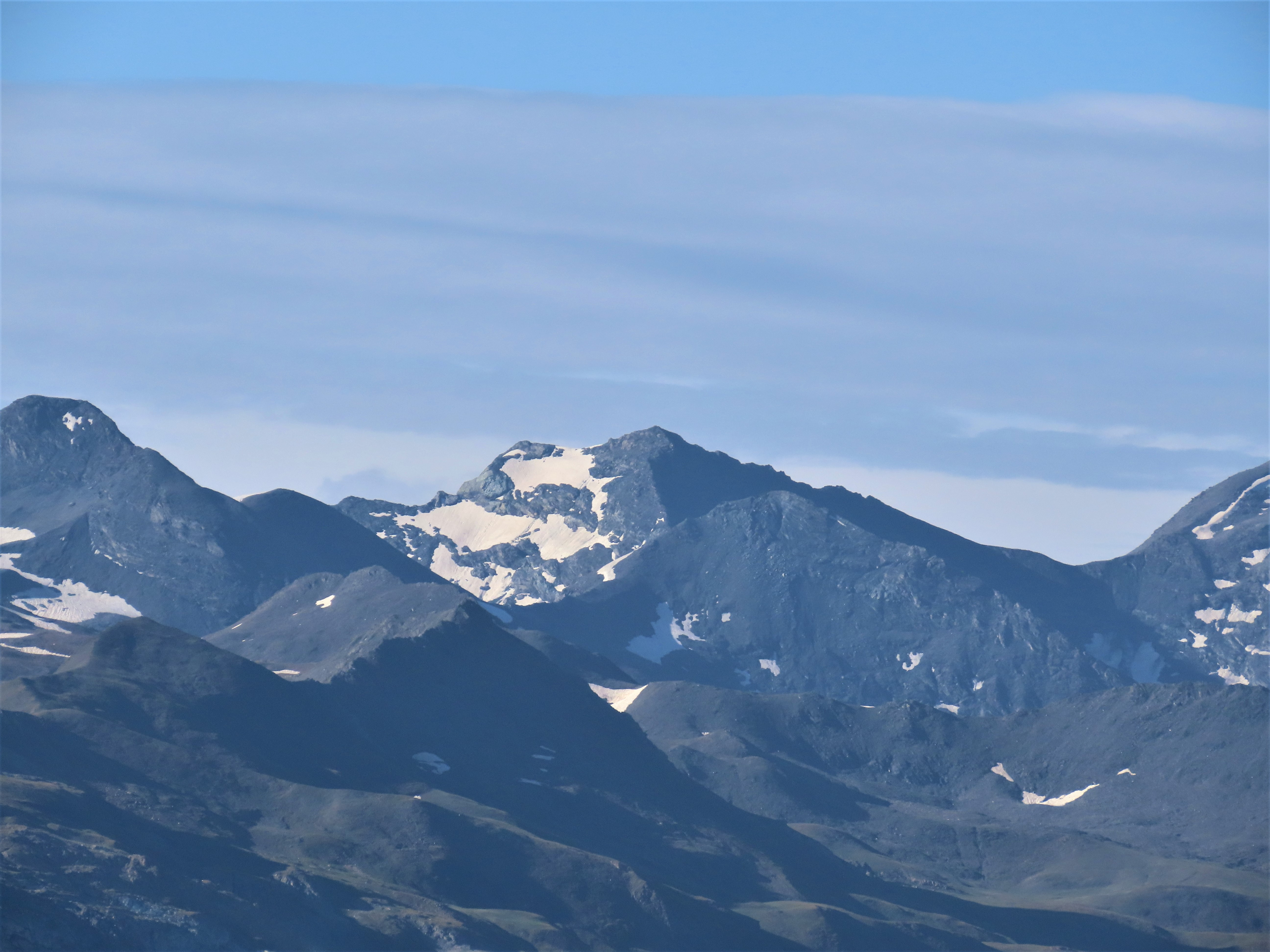

Highest point
- Elevation: 3,355 m (11,007 ft)
- Prominence: 1,260 m (4,130 ft)
- Coordinates: 45°20′31″N 06°58′16″E

Geography
- Location within France
- Location: Savoie, France
- Parent range: Massif de la Vanoise

Pointe de Claret is a mountain of Savoie, France. It lies in the Massif de la Vanoise range. It has an elevation of 3,354 metres above sea level.
