= Pointe Rénod =

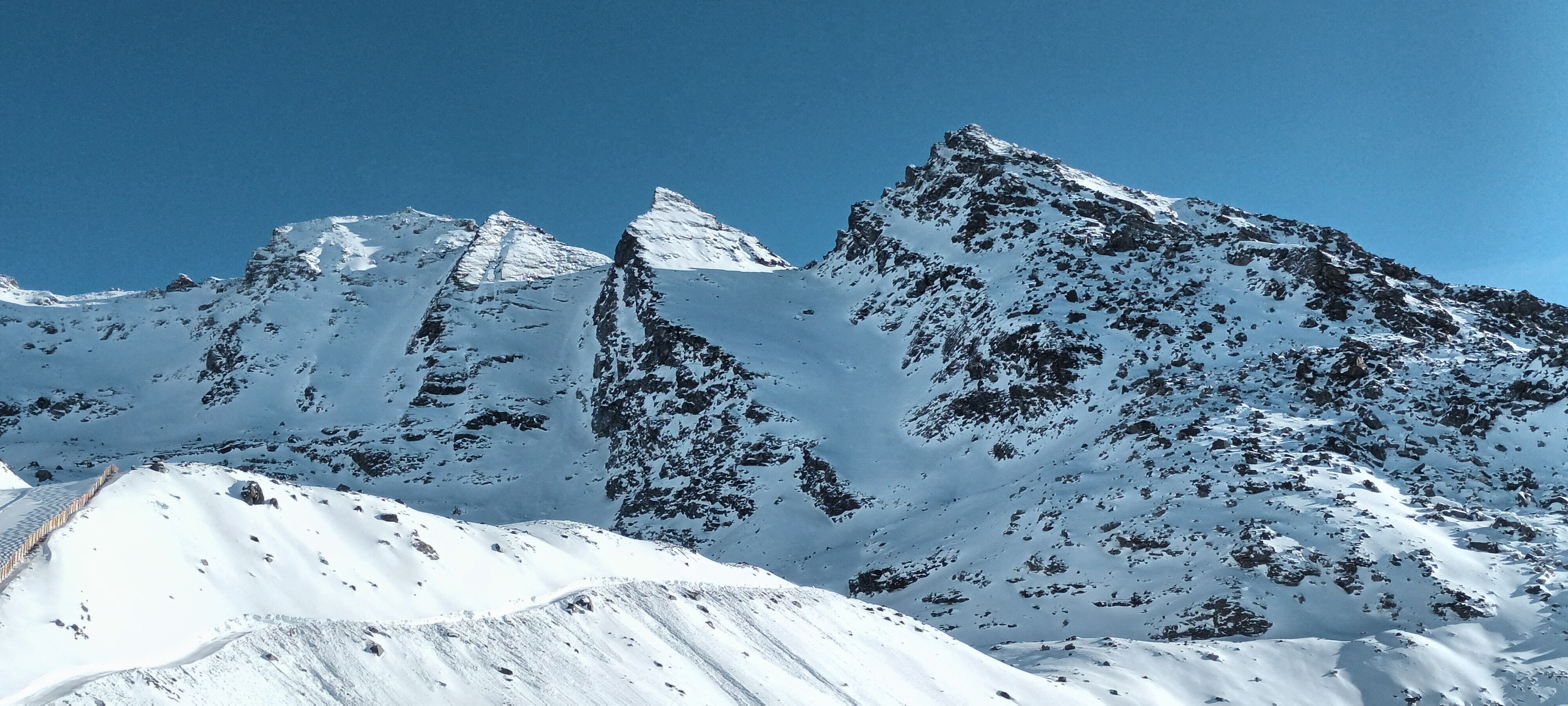
- Pointe Rénod and rocher Rénod.

Highest point
- Elevation: 3,368 m (11,050 ft)
- Coordinates: 45°14′45″N 06°36′19″E

Geography
- Location within France
- Location: Savoie, France
- Parent range: Vanoise Massif

Pointe Rénod is a mountain of Savoie, France. It lies in the Massif de la Vanoise range. It has an elevation of 3,368 metres above sea level. The peak is part of the Vanoise National Park, known for its alpine scenery and biodiversity.
