= Épaule du Bouchet =

Mountain in Savoie, France

- Location within France

Highest point
- Elevation: 3,250 m (10,660 ft)
- Coordinates: 45°15′34″N 06°36′41″E

Geography
- Location: Savoie, France
- Parent range: Massif de la Vanoise

Épaule du Bouchet is a mountain of Savoie, France. It lies in the Vanoise Massif range. It has an elevation of 3,250 m (10,660 ft) above sea level.
