= Pointe de Méan Martin =

Mountain in France

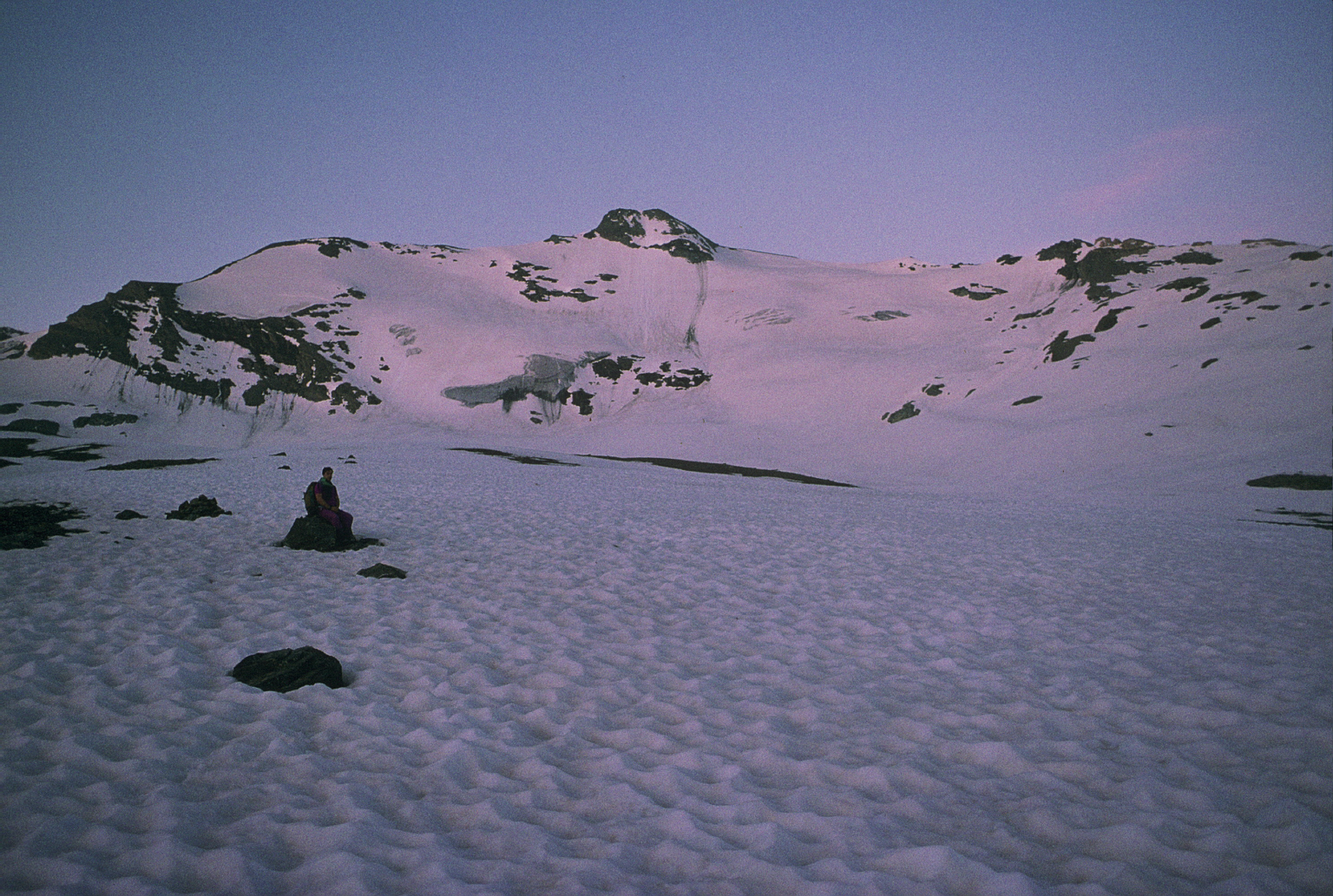
- View on the Pointe de Méan Martin (3 330 m)

Highest point
- Elevation: 3,330 m (10,930 ft)
- Prominence: 240 m (790 ft)
- Coordinates: 45°22′02″N 06°59′24″E

Geography
- Location within France
- Location: Savoie, France
- Parent range: Massif de la Vanoise

Pointe de Méan Martin is a mountain of Savoie, France. It lies in the Massif de la Vanoise range. It has an elevation of 3,330 metres above sea level.
