= Pointes du Châtelard =

Mountain in Savoie, France

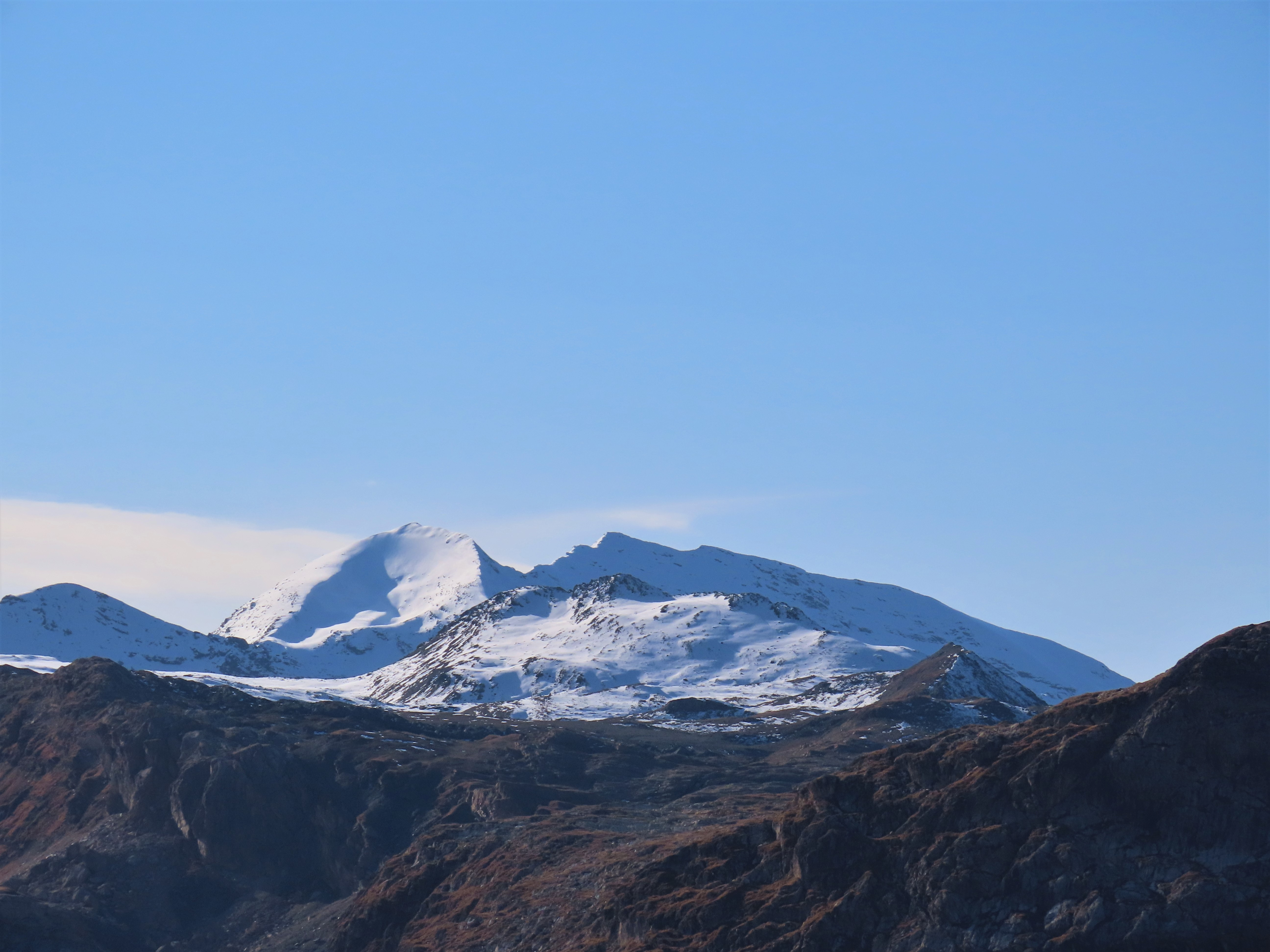

Highest point
- Elevation: 3,479 m (11,414 ft)
- Prominence: 56 m (184 ft)
- Coordinates: 45°19′54″N 06°57′18″E

Geography
- Location within France
- Location: Savoie, France
- Parent range: Vanoise Massif

Pointes du Châtelard is a mountain of Savoie, France. It lies in the Massif de la Vanoise range. It has an elevation of 3,479 metres above sea level.
