= Pointe du Bouchet =

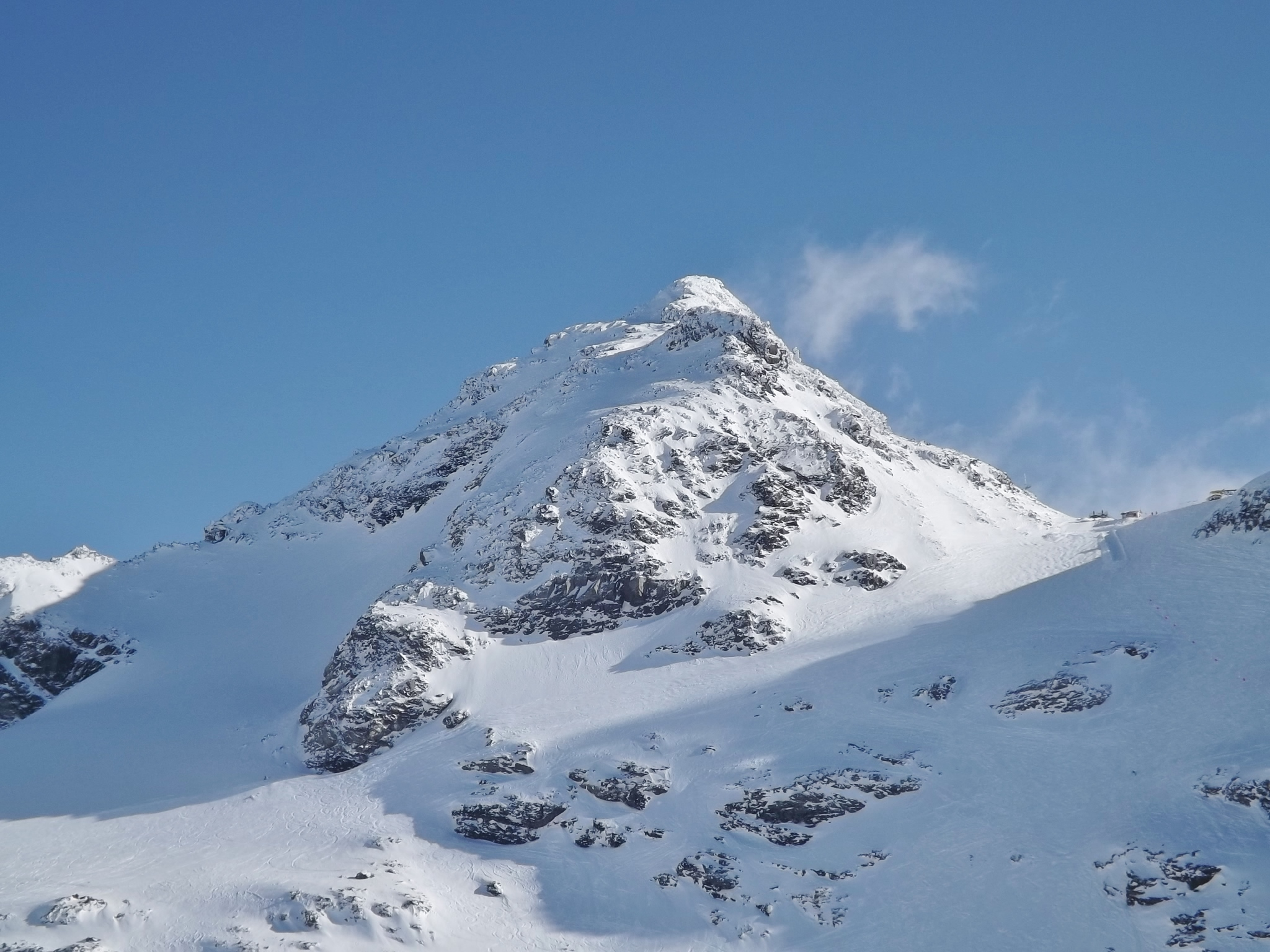

Highest point
- Elevation: 3,416 m (11,207 ft)
- Prominence: 307 m (1,007 ft)
- Listing: Alpine mountains above 3000 m
- Coordinates: 45°15′14″N 06°36′15″E

Geography
- Location within France
- Location: Savoie, France
- Parent range: Vanoise Massif

Pointe du Bouchet is a mountain of Savoie, France. It lies in the Massif de la Vanoise range. It has an elevation of 3,420 metres above sea level.
