= Pointe de la Masse =

Mountain of Savoie, France

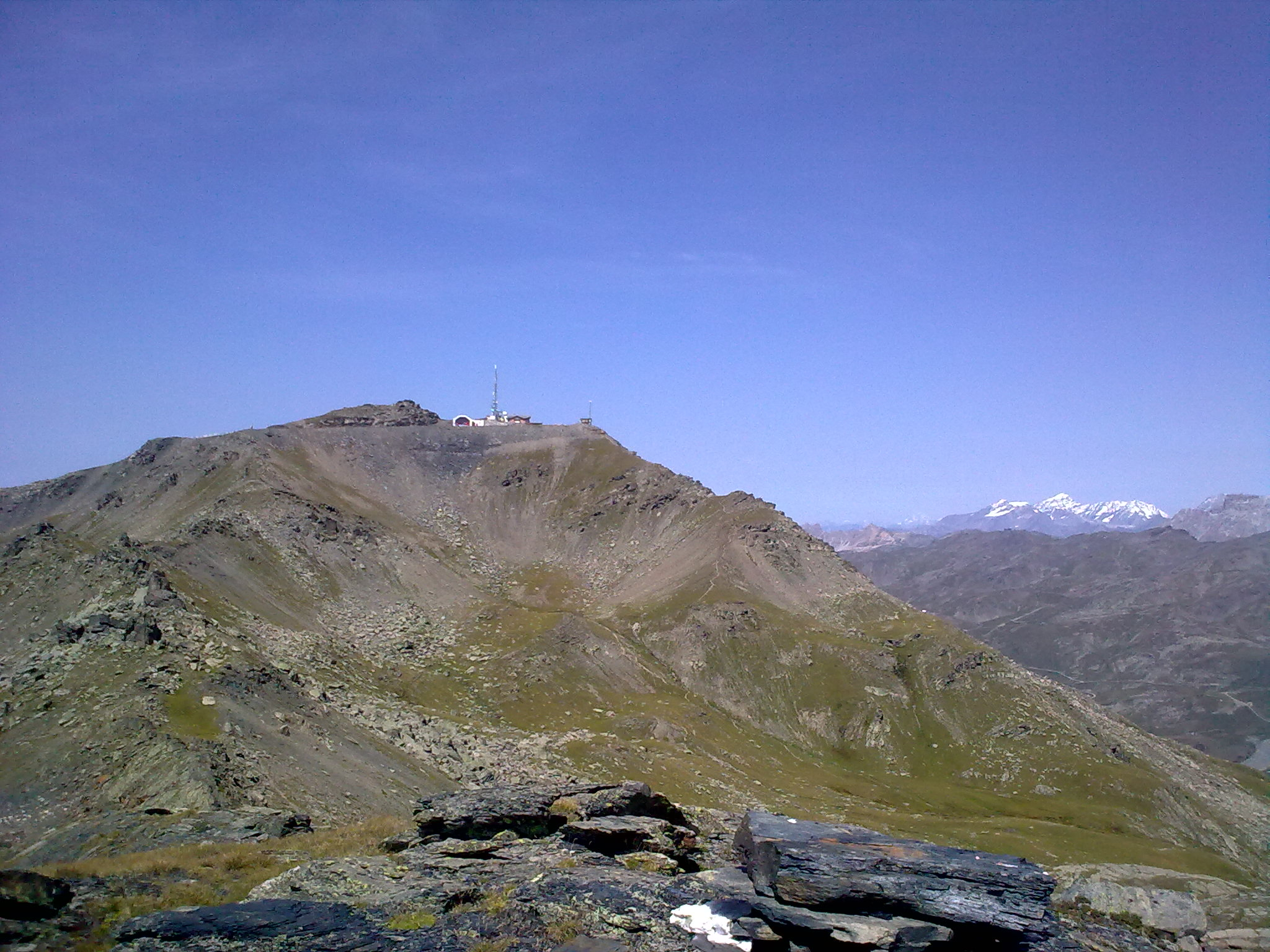
- Pointe de la Masse taken from the Collet Blanc

Highest point
- Elevation: 2,804 m (9,199 ft)
- Coordinates: 45°17′50″N 06°30′33″E

Geography
- Location within France
- Location: Savoie, France
- Parent range: Vanoise Massif

Pointe de la Masse is a mountain of Savoie, France. It lies in the Massif de la Vanoise range. It has an elevation of 2,804 metres above sea level. It is a skiing area near Les Menuires.
