= Pointe des Buffettes =

Mountain in France

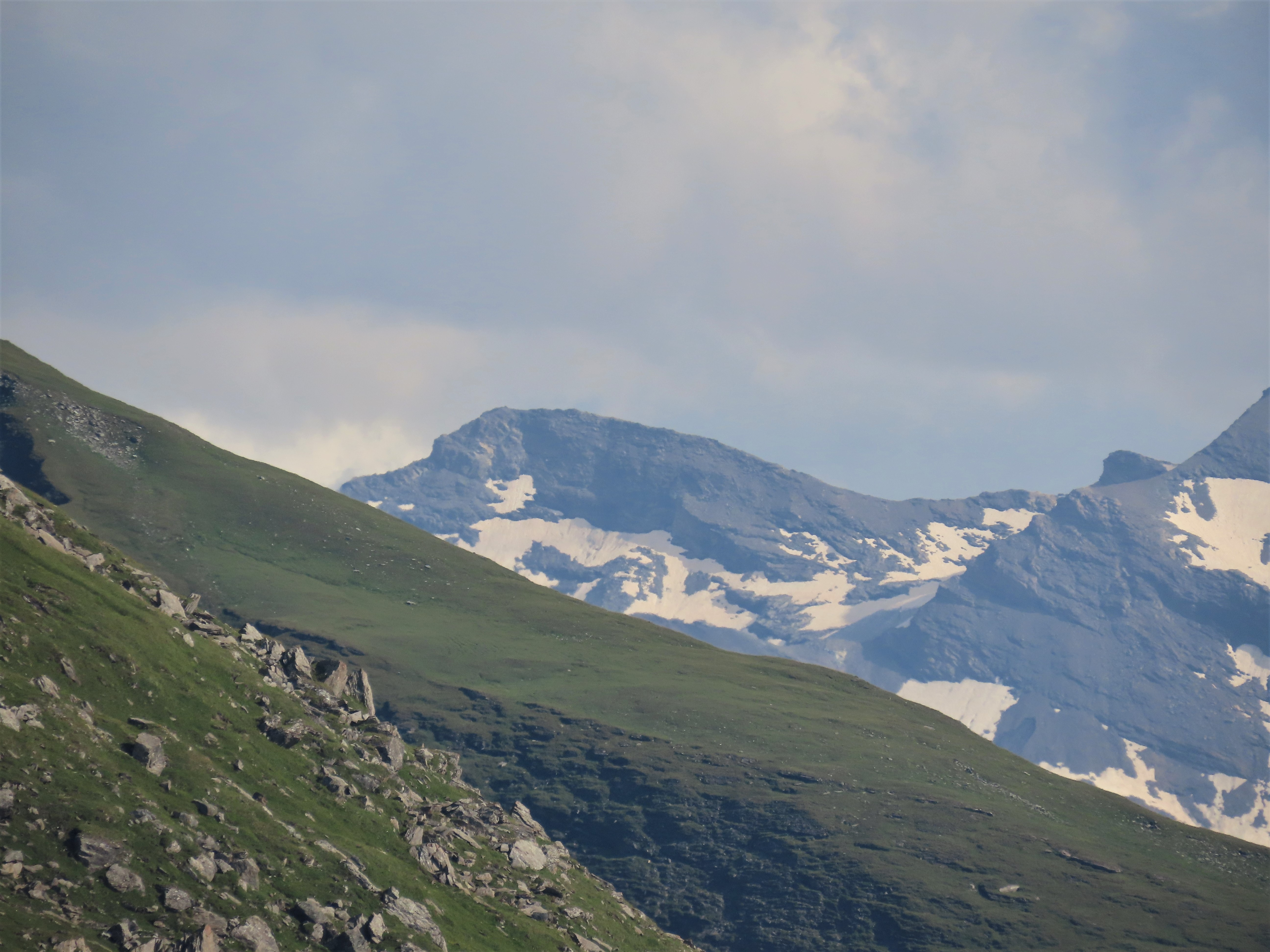

Highest point
- Elevation: 3,233 m (10,607 ft)
- Coordinates: 45°21′56″N 07°00′26″E

Geography
- Location within France
- Location: Savoie, France
- Parent range: Vanoise Massif

Pointe des Buffettes is a mountain of Savoie, France. It lies in the Massif de la Vanoise range. It has an elevation of 3,233 metres above sea level.
