= Dôme des Platières =

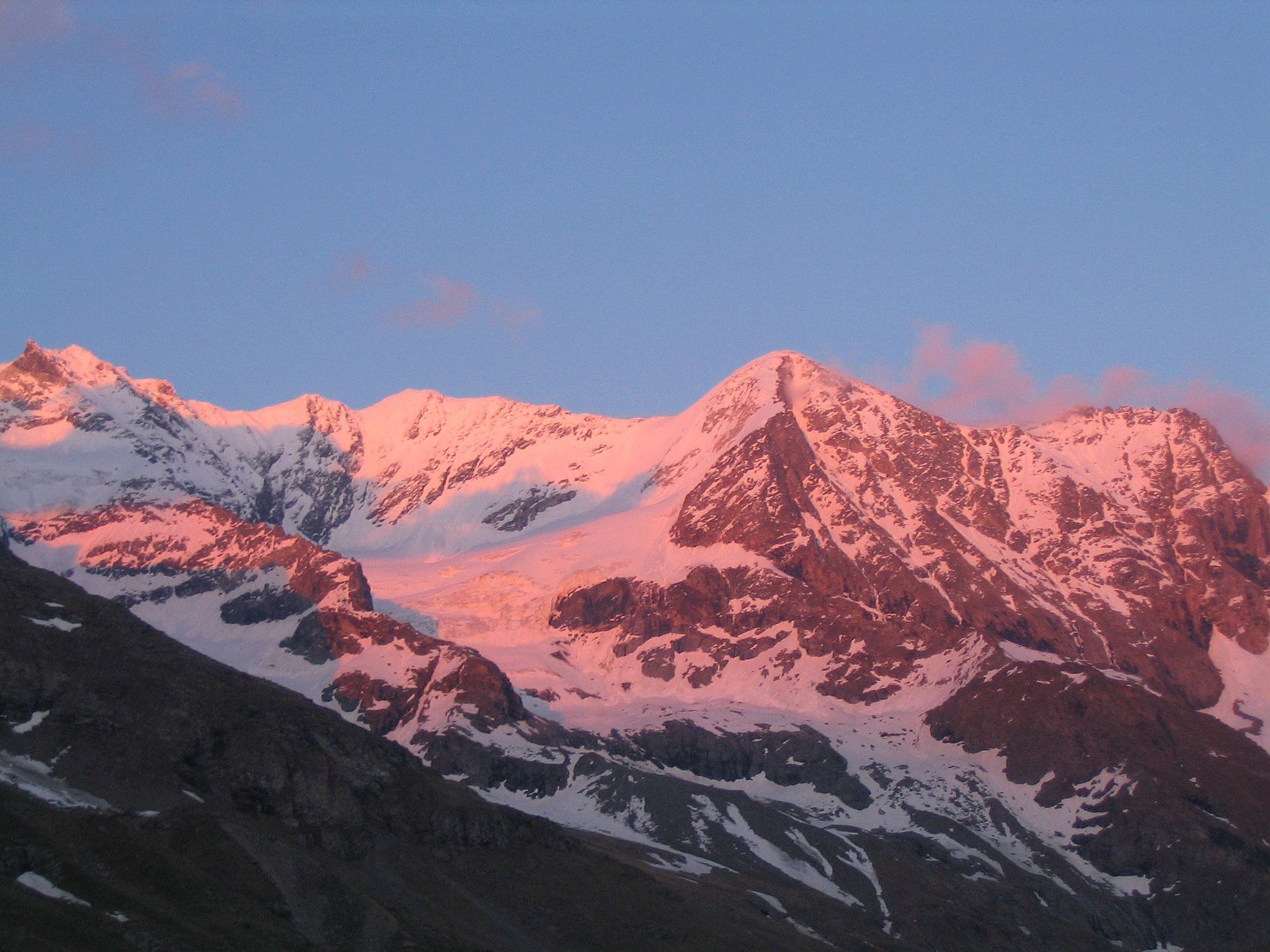

Highest point
- Elevation: 3,473 m (11,394 ft)
- Coordinates: 45°30′27″N 06°51′50″E

Geography
- Location within France
- Location: Savoie, France
- Parent range: Vanoise Massif

Dôme des Platières is a mountain of Savoie, France. It lies in the Massif de la Vanoise range. It has an elevation of 3,473 metres above sea level.
