= Dôme des Pichères =

- Location within France

Highest point
- Elevation: 3,319 m (10,889 ft)
- Prominence: 69 m (226 ft)
- Coordinates: 45°29′30″N 06°47′54″E

Geography
- Location: Savoie, France
- Parent range: Massif de la Vanoise

Dôme des Pichères is a mountain of Savoie, France. It lies in the Massif de la Vanoise range. It has an elevation of 3,319 metres above sea level.
