= Pointe de la Sana =

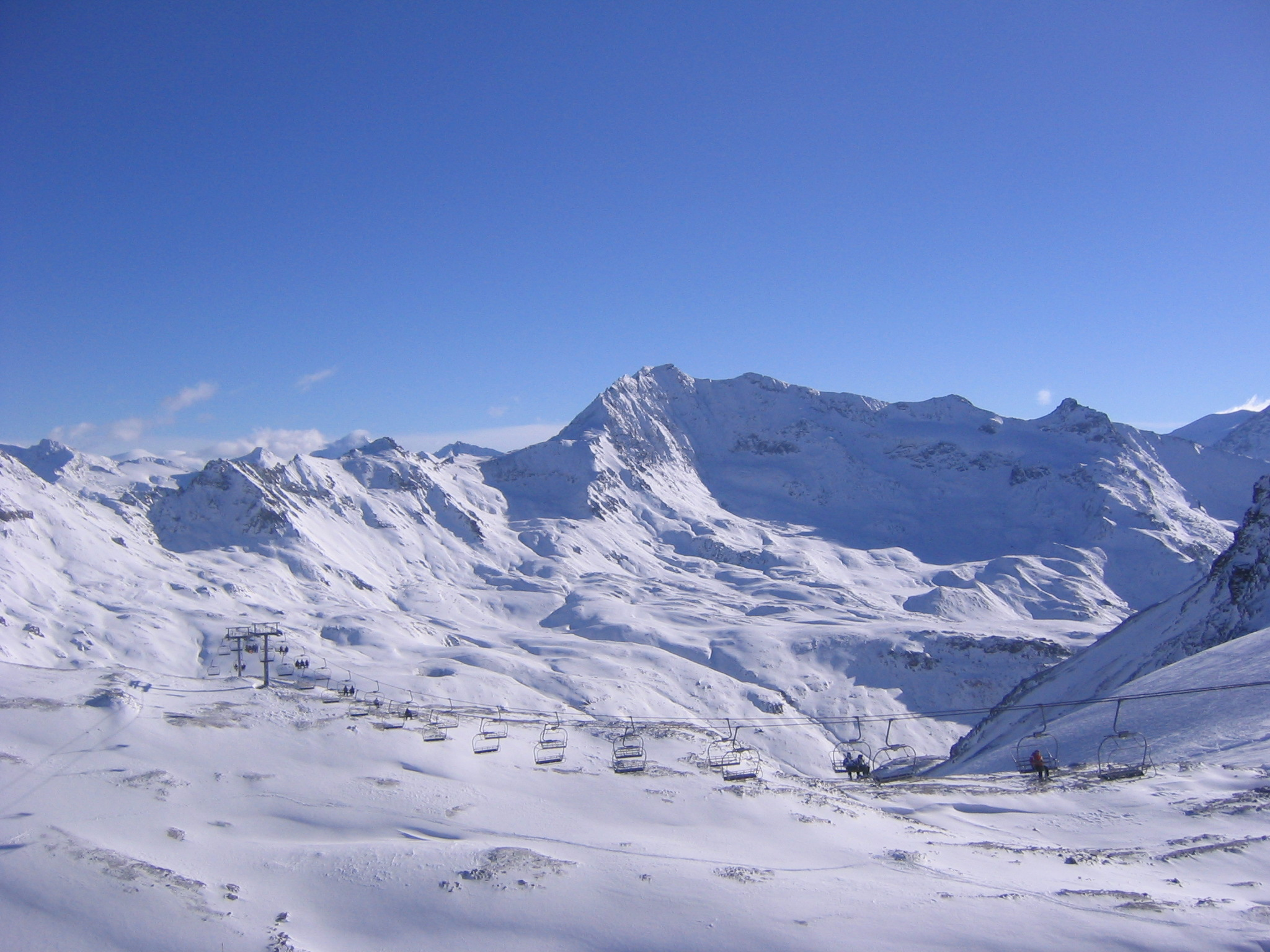
- Pointe de la Sana from the Tignes ski resort.

Highest point
- Elevation: 3,436 m (11,273 ft)
- Prominence: 525 m (1,722 ft)
- Isolation: 6.42 km (3.99 mi)
- Listing: Alpine mountains above 3000 m
- Coordinates: 45°23′07″N 06°55′03″E

Geography
- Location within France
- Location: Savoie, France
- Parent range: Vanoise Massif

Pointe de la Sana is a mountain of Savoie, France. It lies in the Massif de la Vanoise range and has an elevation of 3,436 metres above sea level.
