= Aiguille de Péclet =

Mountain in Italy

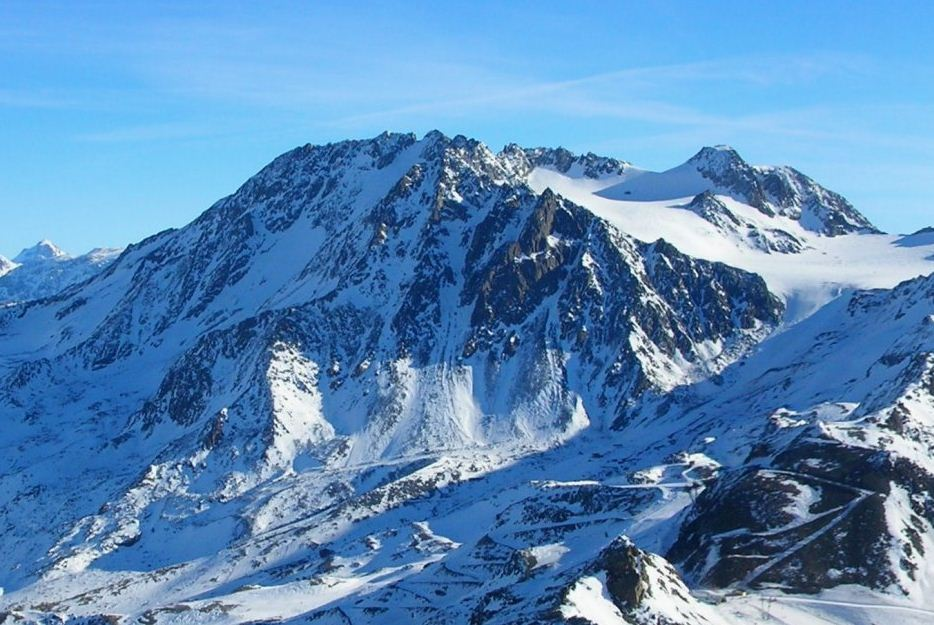
- Aiguille de Péclet

Highest point
- Elevation: 3,561 m (11,683 ft)
- Prominence: 766 m (2,513 ft)
- Isolation: 10.4 km (6.5 mi)
- Listing: Alpine mountains above 3000 m
- Coordinates: 45°16′52″N 06°37′26″E

Geography
- Location within Alps
- Location: Savoie, France
- Parent range: Graian Alps

Aiguille de Péclet (3,561 m) is a mountain of Savoie, France. It lies in the Massif de la Vanoise in the Graian Alps east of the resort of Val Thorens, on the edge of the Vanoise National Park.
