= Vanoise Massif =

Mountain range in the Western Alps

- French: Massif de la Vanoise; Italian: Massiccio della Vanoise
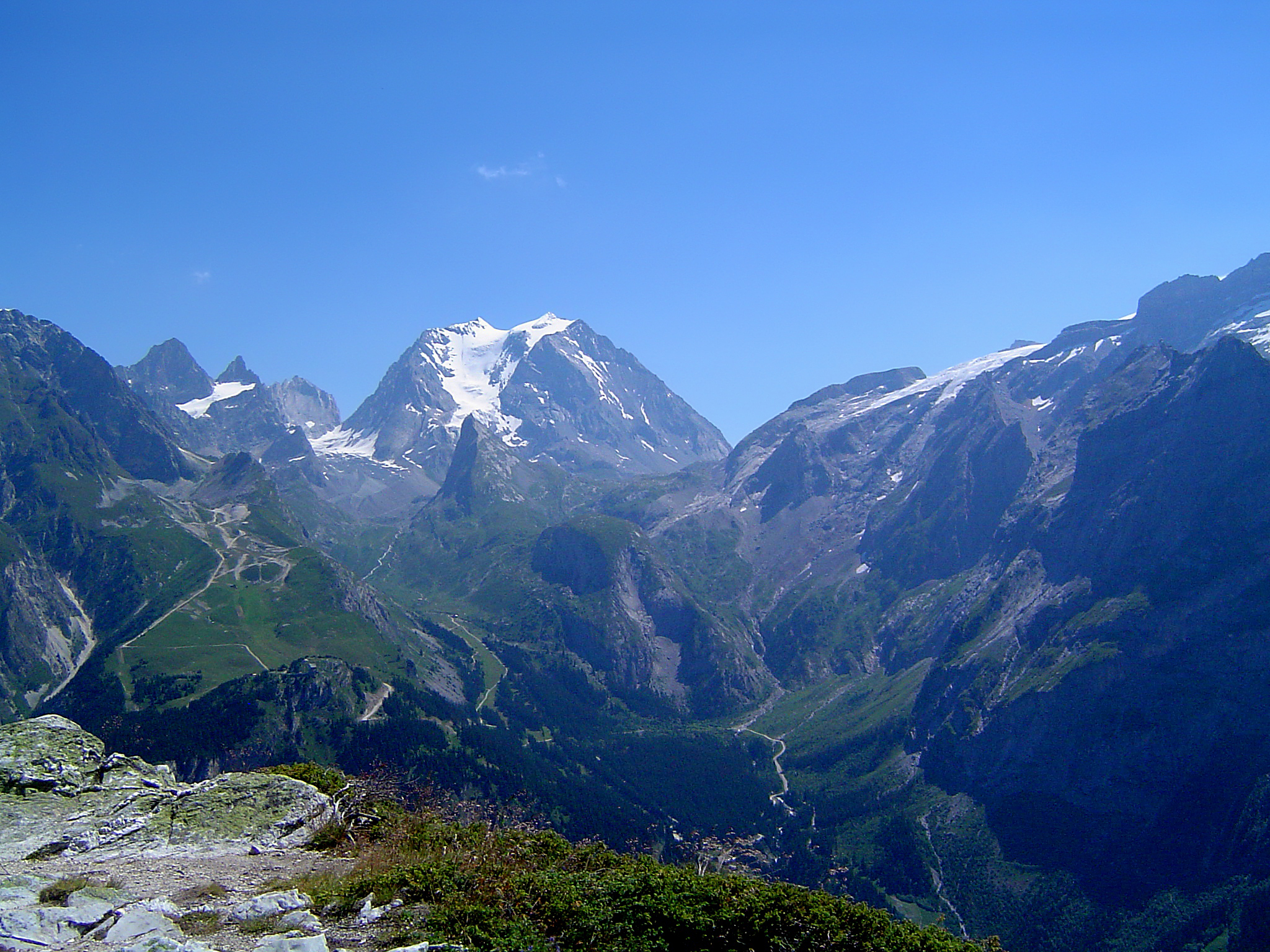
- The south-west side of the Grande Casse

Highest point
- Peak: Grande Casse
- Elevation: 3,855 m (12,648 ft)
- Coordinates: 45°24′19″N 6°49′39″E

Geography
- Map with subvisions of the French Alps
- Country: France
- Department: Savoie
- Parent range: Graian Alps

The Vanoise Massif (French: massif de la Vanoise, pronounced [masif də la vanwaz]) is a mountain range of the Graian Alps, located in the Western Alps. After the Mont Blanc Massif and the Écrins Massif, it is the third-highest massif in France, reaching a height of 3,855 m (12,648 ft) at the summit of Grande Casse. It lies between Tarentaise Valley to the north and the Maurienne Valley in the south. The range is the site of France's first national park, Vanoise National Park, established in 1963. The ski resorts of Tignes and Val-d'Isère and the 2,770 metres (9,090 ft)-high Col de l'Iseran are located in the eastern part of the range.

== Principal summits ==
The principal summits of the Vanoise Massif are:

- Grande Casse, 3,855 m (12,648 ft)
- Mont Pourri, 3,779 m (12,398 ft)
- Dent Parrachée, 3,697 m (12,129 ft)
- Grande Motte, 3,653 m (11,985 ft)
- Pointe de la Fournache, 3,642 m (11,949 ft)
- Dôme de la Sache, 3,601 m (11,814 ft)
- Dôme de l'Arpont, 3,601 m (11,814 ft)
- Dôme de Chasseforêt, 3,586 m (11,765 ft)
- Grand Roc Noir, 3,582 m (11,752 ft)
- Dôme des Nants, 3,570 m (11,710 ft)
- Aiguille de Péclet 3,561 m (11,683 ft)
- Mont Turia, 3,550 m (11,650 ft)
- Aiguille de Polset, 3,534 m (11,594 ft)
- Mont de Gébroulaz, 3,511 m (11,519 ft)
- Pointes du Châtelard 3,479 m (11,414 ft)
- Dôme des Platières, 3,473 m (11,394 ft)
- Roc des Saints Pères, 3,470 m (11,380 ft)
- Pointe de la Sana, 3,436 m (11,273 ft)
- Pointe de l'Échelle, 3,422 m (11,227 ft)
- Pointe du Bouchet, 3,420 m (11,220 ft)
- Bellecôte, 3,417 m (11,211 ft)
- Grand Bec, 3,398 m (11,148 ft)
- Pointe du Vallonnet, 3,372 m (11,063 ft)
- Pointe Rénod, 3,368 m (11,050 ft)
- Dôme des Sonnailles, 3,361 m (11,027 ft)
- Pointe de Claret, 3,355 m (11,007 ft)
- Pointe de Méan Martin, 3,330 m (10,930 ft)
- Dôme de Polset, 3,326 m (10,912 ft)
- Dôme des Pichères, 3,319 m (10,889 ft)
- Grand Roc, 3,316 m (10,879 ft)
- Roche Chevrière, 3,281 m (10,764 ft)
- Pointe de Thorens, 3,266 m (10,715 ft)
- Mont Pelve, 3,261 m (10,699 ft)
- Épaule du Bouchet, 3,250 m (10,660 ft)
- Pointe des Buffettes, 3,233 m (10,607 ft)
- Aiguille Rouge, 3,227 m (10,587 ft)
- Pointe de la Réchasse, 3,212 m (10,538 ft)
- Pointe du Dard, 3,206 m (10,518 ft)
- Mont du Borgne, 3,153 m (10,344 ft)
- Mont Brequin, 3,130 m (10,270 ft)
- Pointe de la Masse, 2,804 m (9,199 ft)
- Aiguille de la Vanoise, 2,796 m (9,173 ft)
- Sommet de la Saulire, 2,738 m (8,983 ft)
- Croix des Têtes, 2,492 m (8,176 ft)

== Principal glaciers ==
- Glacier de Chavière
- Glacier de Gébroulaz
- Glacier de la Grande Casse
- Glacier de la Grande-Motte
- Glacier de la Leisse
- Glacier de la Mahure
- Glacier de la Savinaz
- Glacier de l'Arpont
- Glacier de Méan Martin
- Glacier de Polset
- Glacier de Prémou
- Glacier de Thorens
- Glacier des Fours
- Glacier des Volnets
- Glacier du Bouchet
- Glacier du Geay
- Glacier du Pelve
- Glacier du Vallonnet, Pralognan-la-Vanoise
- Glacier du Vallonnet, Val-Cenis
- Glaciers de la Gurraz
- Glaciers de la Vanoise

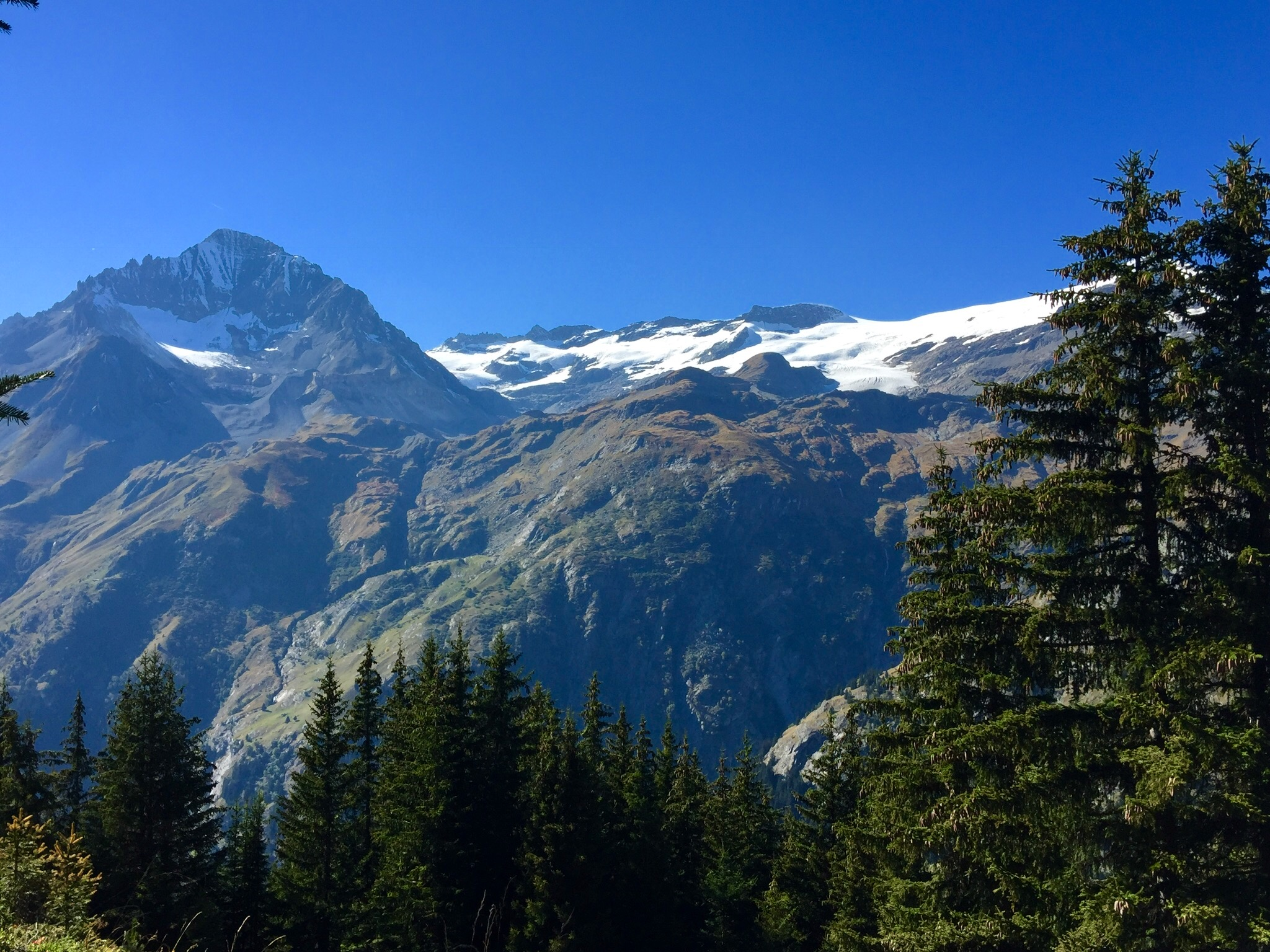
The Arpont-Chasseforêt glacier is the main glacier in the Vanoise National Park
