= Aiguille de Polset =

Mountain in Savoie, France

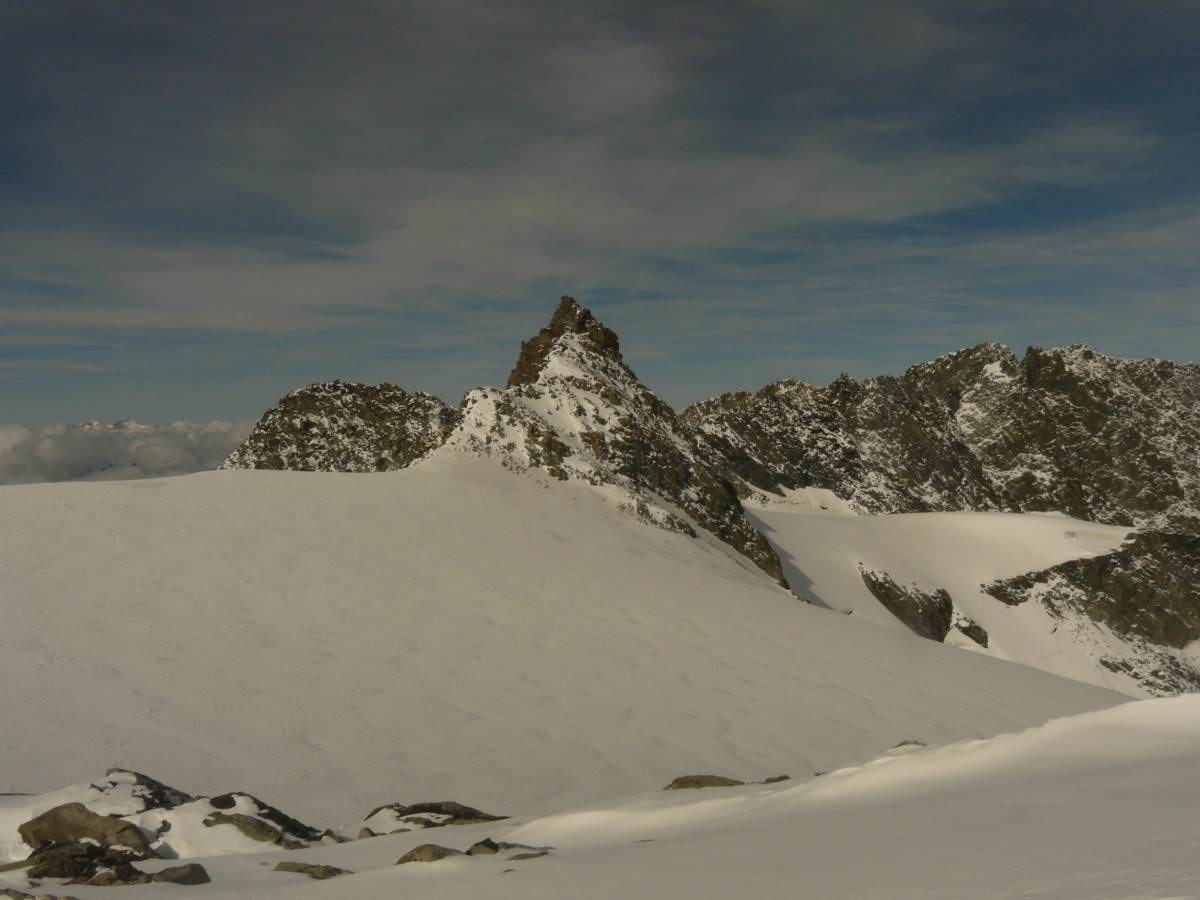
- Aiguille de Polset with snow

Highest point
- Elevation: 3,531 m (11,585 ft)
- Prominence: 87 m (285 ft)
- Coordinates: 45°16′35″N 06°38′31″E

Geography
- Location within France
- Location: Savoie, France
- Parent range: Massif de la Vanoise

Aiguille de Polset is a mountain of Savoie, France. It lies in the Massif de la Vanoise range. It has an elevation of 3,531 metres above sea level.
