= Dent Parrachée =

Mountain in France

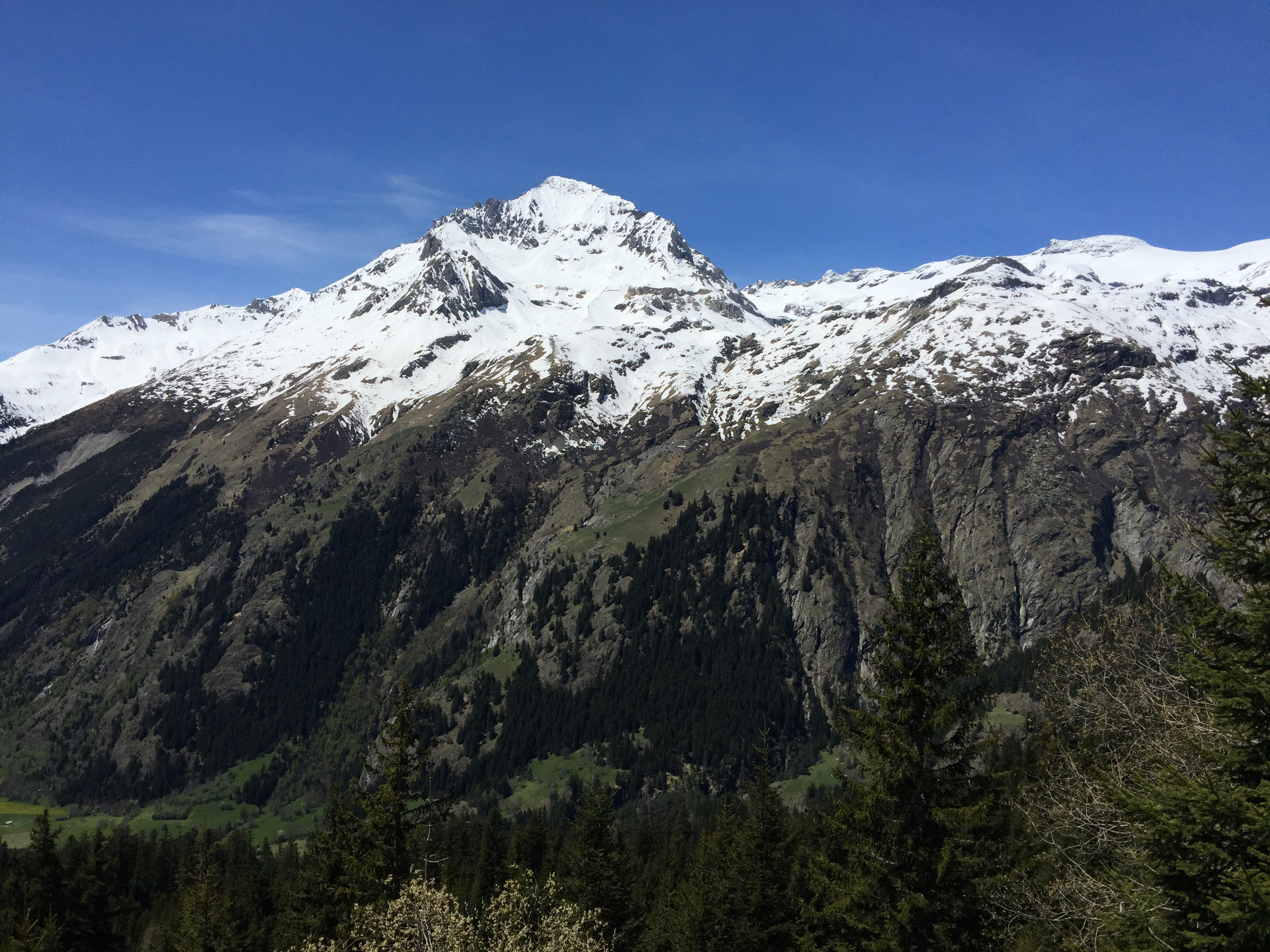
- The east face of Dent Parrachée

Highest point
- Elevation: 3,697 m (12,129 ft)
- Prominence: 1,180 m (3,870 ft)
- Isolation: 13.22 km (8.21 mi)
- Listing: Alpine mountains above 3000 m
- Coordinates: 45°17′31″N 06°45′22″E

Geography
- Location within Alps
- Location: Savoie, France
- Parent range: Massif de la Vanoise

Dent Parrachée is a mountain of Savoie, France. It lies in the Massif de la Vanoise range. It has an elevation of 3,697 metres above sea level.
