= Grand Roc Noir =

Mountain in France

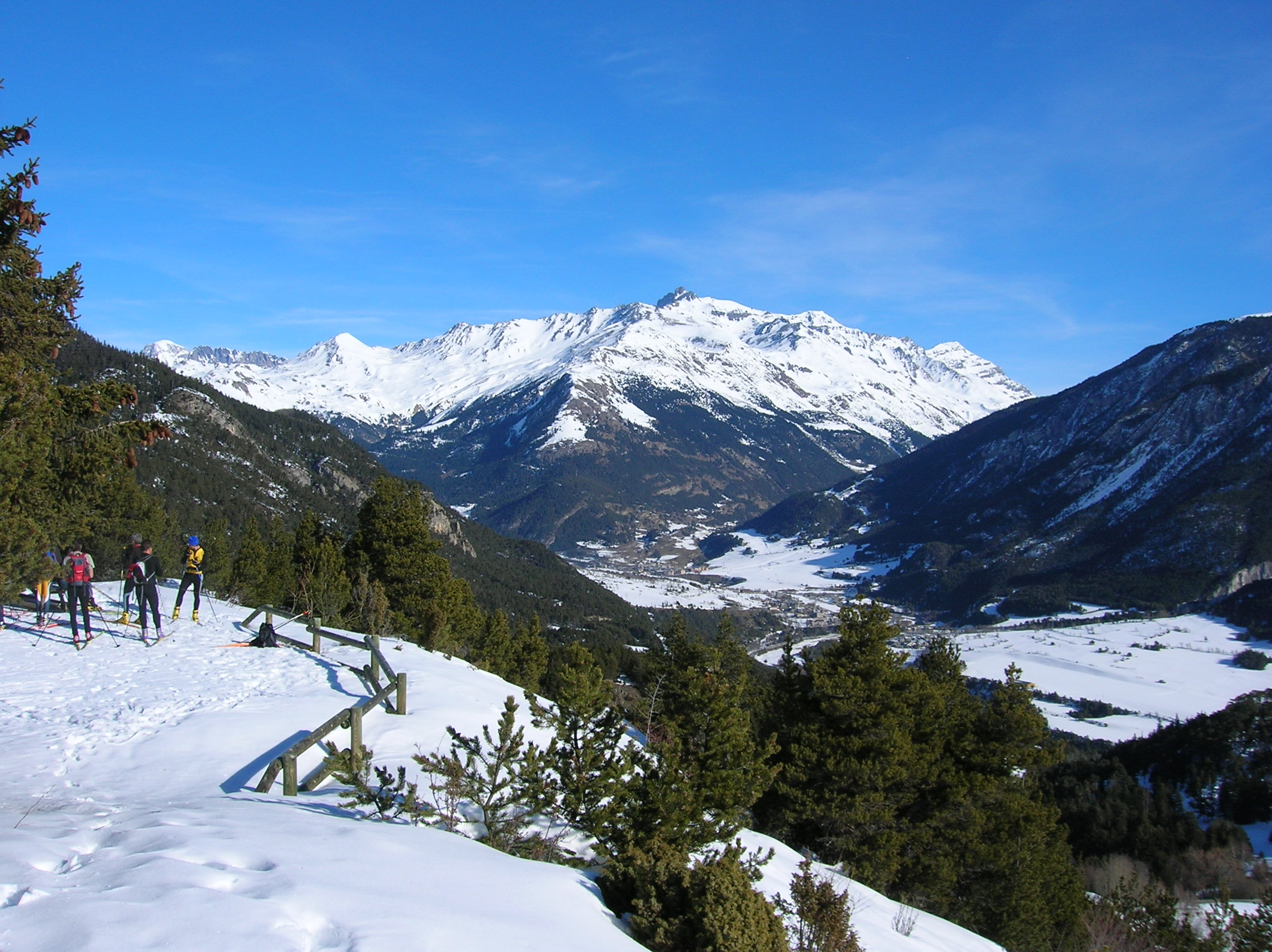

Highest point
- Elevation: 3,582 m (11,752 ft)
- Prominence: 818 m (2,684 ft)
- Isolation: 9.04 km (5.62 mi)
- Listing: Alpine mountains above 3000 m
- Coordinates: 45°19′49″N 06°53′30″E

Geography
- Location within France
- Location: Savoie, France
- Parent range: Vanoise Massif

Grand Roc Noir is a mountain of Savoie, France. It lies in the Massif de la Vanoise range. It has an elevation of 3,582 metres above sea level.
