= Ski-BASE jumping =

Base jumping with skis

Ski-BASE jumping involves free-falling through the air prior to releasing a parachute

Ski-BASE jumping is the recreational sport of skiing at a high speed off of a cliff or mountain and free-falling through the air, using a parachute to descend to the ground, therefore combining the two sports of skiing and BASE jumping. Participants often perform tricks or manoeuvres during the freefall and remove their skis mid-air in order to safely deploy the parachute and land.

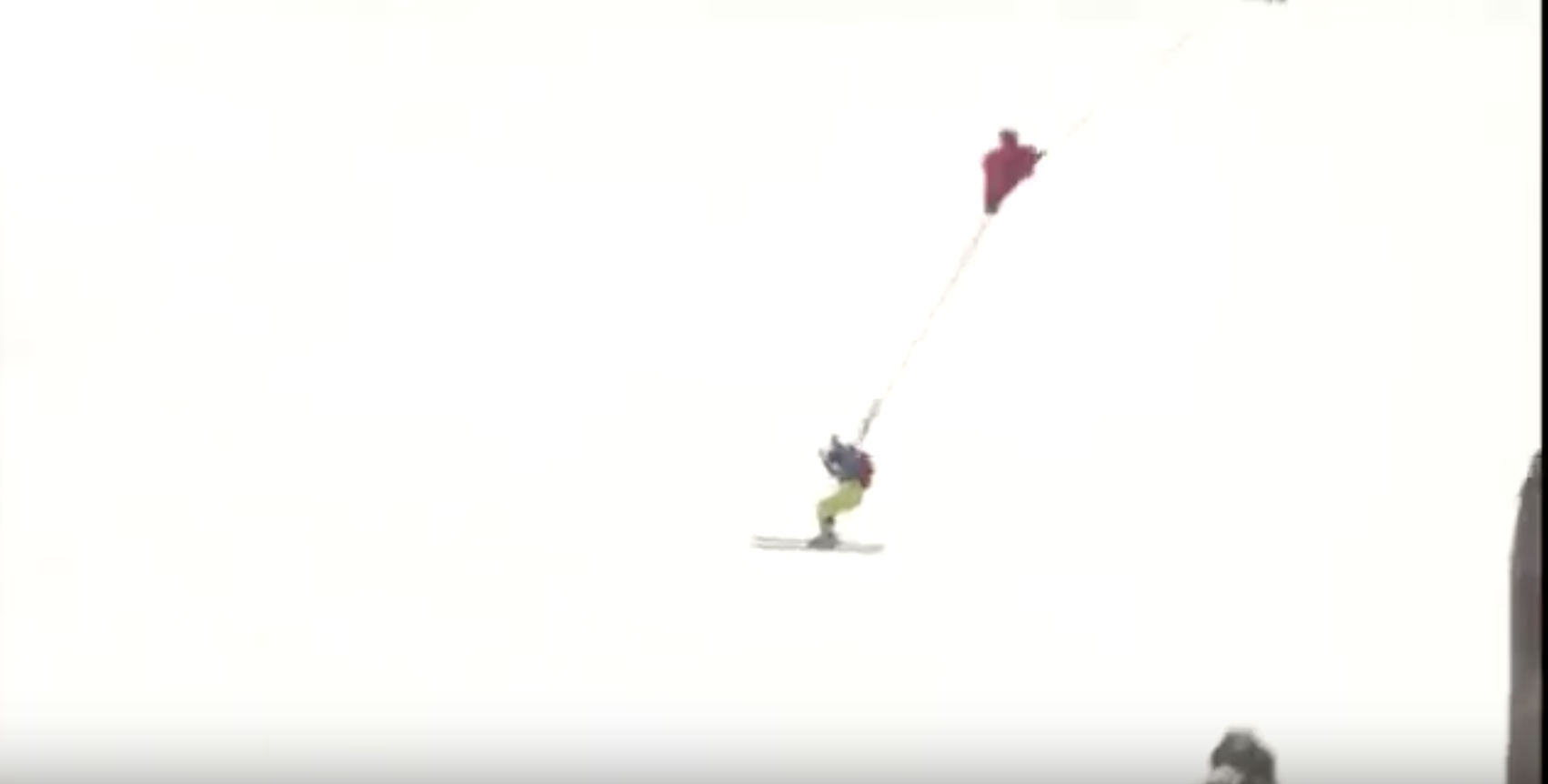
Ski-BASE jumping - Glen Anderson

Ski-BASE jumping requires an advanced skiing ability alongside traditional BASE jumping skills. BASE jumping is largely executed in alpine conditions, and is considered a highly dangerous sport.

== History and notable jumps ==
- The first ski-BASE jump was performed by Rick Sylvester on January 30, 1972 at a cliff face located in Yosemite, El Capitan, California. The jump location was situated 3,200 feet above the valley floor. The jump was filmed by a camera crew and featured within a film titled Earth Rider, which starred Sylvester's jump.
- In 1976, Sylvester performed another ski-BASE jump in Mount Asgard as a stunt double in the July 1976 James Bond film 'The Spy Who Loved Me', starring Roger Moore. The stunt was completed only once due to bad weather, with a single camera successfully capturing suitable footage for the film. The stunt formed part of the opening scene of the film with a running time of 2 minutes 41 seconds.
- In 1991 French jumper Jean René Gayvallet was then the first to Ski-Base, slider-up, no PC hand held and no release system on his skis. He jumped different spot around Chamonix area (France). He then also jumped the North Face of Eiger (Switzerland) in November the same year and was already performing huge front flip which was at the time a big step done in the sport. In 1993 and 1994 his jumps were part of the opening scene of a TV series " Extrem " and can be seen also in TV commercial spot like Mountain Dew, Pepsi Max, Nordica, Ford. Jean René Gayvallet is also a SAG member as stunt man and worked on Movies like "Terminal Velocity".
- In 2003, professional skier Shane McConkey ski-BASE jumped from the cliff "Lover's Leap" in Lake Tahoe, California. Later that year McConkey executed another ski-BASE jump in Bella Coola, British Columbia.
- On April 21, 2004, freestyle skiers Shane McConkey and J.T Holmes ski-BASE jumped from La Clusaz. McConkey and Holmes further pioneered the sport by ski-BASE jumping from the Eiger North Face in Switzerland in 2004. McConkey performed a double-flip prior to releasing his parachute. This jump was featured in 2015 as part of the 60 Minutes documentary "Taking on the Eiger".
- On February 25, 2007 Shane McConkey performed the first ski-BASE jump using a wingsuit, at Gridsetskolten, Norway. This pioneered the sport of wingsuit ski-BASE jumping. During that year McConkey also ski-BASE jumped off of the Silver Legacy hotel in Reno, Nevada.
- In 2011, French skier Matthias Giraud executed a ski-BASE jump in the French Alps. During the jump, Giraud triggered an avalanche behind him. The jump was filmed by photographer Stefan Laude using a GoPro Hero camera. Giraud's achievements are listed on his website www.superfrenchie.com wherein he is accredited as the first person to: ski-BASE jump off Mt Hood in Oregon, ski-BASE jump off Engineer Mountain in Silverton, Colorado, ski-BASE jump off Aiguille Croche in Megeve, France, ski-BASE jump off Ajax Peak in Telluride, Colorado, ski-BASE jump off Ingram Peak in Telluride, Colorado, ski-BASE jump off Petite Balm in Tignes, France, ski-BASE jump off Castle Rock in Durango, Colorado, and ski-BASE jumped off Point d'Areu in France.
- In 2011, professional BASE jumper Erik Roner performed the first ski-BASE jump in Macedonia. The jump is featured in season 4 episode 8 of the Behind the Line series.
- In 2012, Red Bull Media House and Matchstick Productions released the documentary History of Ski Base as part of the series Ultimate Rush, produced by Murray Wais and Steve Winter. The episode primarily features ski-BASE jumpers Shane McConkey and J.T Holmes.
- In 2014, professional freestyle skier Mike Wilson executed a ski-BASE jump from the Perrine Bridge in Twin Falls, Idaho. The jump was performed during summer and required ice to be imported in order to create the ramp. Wilson performed a railing grind along the barrier of the bridge prior to the jump. He executed the jump twice, after slipping and falling the first time due to a technical error. The jump was filmed by company Stept Productions for the action film 'Mutiny'.
- Norwegian freestyle skier Karina Hollekim is considered to be the first female to perform a ski-BASE jump. Her father was a Norwegian ski instructor. The American female skier Suz Graham is also currently recognized as one of the only active females to participate in the sport. Graham has performed over 25 ski-BASE jumps. She has also featured as a stunt double performing a ski-BASE jump for the music video "Winter Game" by Japanese band Girl Next Door.
- Alaskan athlete Pryce Brown ski-BASE jumped from the Stawamus Chief, British Columbia, on December 26, 2015. The granite cliff is situated 2,303 feet above ground.
- In March 2018, BASE jumpers Richard Grove, Mike Bickley and Miles Daisher ski-BASE jumped from the Rock Springs Buttress outside of Jackson Hole Mountain Resort. The jump was filmed by Tim Schwartz using GoPro and drone cameras.
- French skier Matthias Giraud achieved the record of the highest ski-BASE jump, on June 24, 2019. Matthais skied from Mont Blanc, situated in the Western European Alps and 4,359 metres above sea level.
- In March 2022, BASE jumpers Jesse Hall, Mark Ortiz, Adam Milhouse, Richard Grove, Logan Johnson, Austin Hollingshead, E-Rach Donovan, and Orion Remaniak performed ski-BASE jumpers in the Caribou-Targhee National Forest at the first ever @jessehallskibase Invitational.

== Equipment ==
Ski-BASE jumping usually requires the following equipment:

- Mountaineering tools to assist with reaching the slope. (A helicopter may also be used to access inaccessible areas).
- Ski equipment: skis, poles, helmet, clothing. The skiing equipment also often requires a specialised mechanism to allow the automatic release of the skis to prevent the skier becoming flipped upside down during free-fall.
- BASE jumping equipment: BASE container and BASE parachute. BASE jumping typically involves a single parachute, as it is considered to be a safer and less complex system than accommodating a reserve parachute. BASE containers are used to secure the parachute around the back of the participant and cost between $1000 and US$1500. BASE parachutes or canopies are ejected from the container to assist with landing and cost over US$2,500.
- In order to begin participating in ski-BASE jumping, interested participants are usually required to gain necessary skills by completing a number of skydives in order to learn to fly and a control a parachute. This allows for practicing using relevant equipment where the margin of error is greater than in a standard BASE jump. Professional freestyle skier Max Kuszaj identified the risks of wind resistance and weight of the skis during the jump as causing participants to flip around and make contact with the cliff.
- Key manufacturing companies of ski-BASE jumping equipment include Apex Base, a Southern Californian organisation.

== Fatalities ==
While no studies have been performed concerning the mortality rate within the sport of ski-BASE jumping, a 2002 study of the fatality risk for BASE jumping estimates a death rate of 1 per 60 participants.

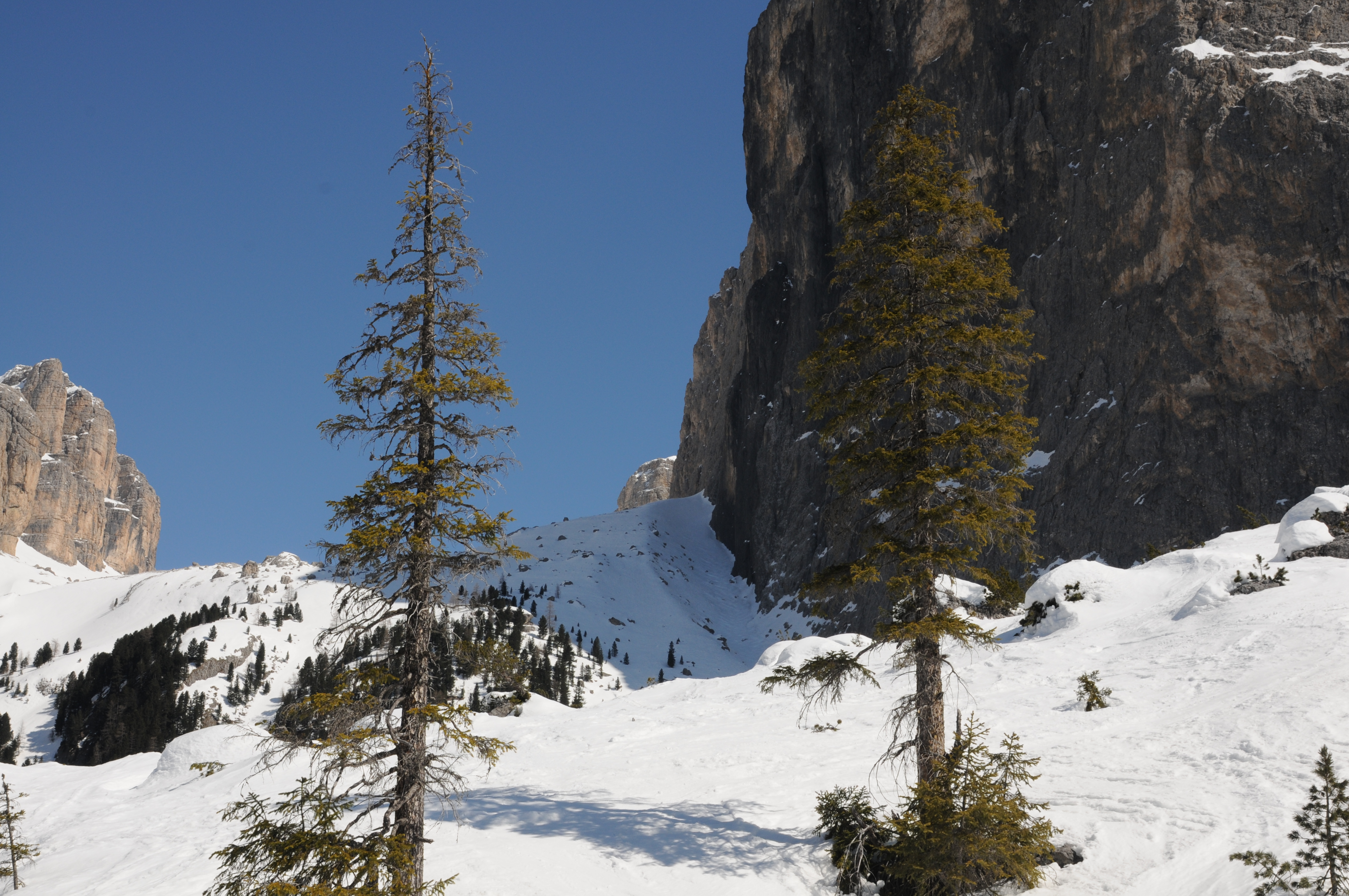
The site where Shane McConkey was fatally injured during a ski-BASE jump in 2009

Famous pioneer of ski-BASE jumping Shane McConkey died in an accident during a ski-BASE jump at the mountain Sass Pordoi in the Dolomites of Italy in 2009 when he was unable to release his skis before deploying his parachute. The mountain was 600 metres above ground level and located next to the renowned ski resort of Corvora. After performing a double back-flip from the cliff face, he was flipped upside down due to a technical issue with releasing his skis. McConkey was unable to release the parachute prior to reaching the ground. He was 39 years old. McConkey had already BASE jumped the same cliff the year before and was yet to attempt a ski-BASE jump from the mountain.

A subsequent documentary outlining his life and death was released in 2013, titled McConkey. The documentary premiered in April 2013 at the Tribeca Film Festival. In an interview recorded close to the time of his death, McConkey described his experience with ski-BASE jumping as 'I'm getting maximum enjoyment out of life and I'll never stop".

In 2008, professional freestyle skier Max Kuzsaj suffered near-fatal injuries during a ski-BASE jump at Echo Mountain in Utah. He was hospitalised after being blown into the cliff during the jump.

Ski-BASE jumper Erik Roner perished while performing a normal skydiving jump in Lake Tahoe, California in 2015. Roner was known for ski-BASE jumping from well-known locations including Cody Peak in Jackson Hole.

== Legal issues ==
The primary legal issue of ski-BASE jumping is related to the legality of performing such jumps within particular locations.

The application to perform the first ski-BASE jump by Rick Sylvester at the Yosemite Valley was rejected by national park authorities who banned participants from using the space. They illegally skied against the orders of the national park in order to complete the jump. The jump was performed at 11:00 am on January 30, 1972, and required a helicopter to airlift the camera crew and skiers to the slope. A large orange banner had also been placed on the valley floor in order to mark the landing position for Sylvester. Although the crew had been threatened with imprisonment prior to completing the stunt, they were never caught.

Since 1979, over 6,000 illegal jumps have been performed in and around Yosemite National Park.

Ski-BASE jumping is banned across all 55 US national parks, with moderate fines enforced for trespassers. Few places exist that allow ski-BASE jumps to be legally performed. Perrine Bridge in Twin Falls, Idaho, is one of the only bridges within the US that allows ski-BASE jumps. Utah also contains various sites that ski-BASE jumps are able to be executed legally from, forming part of the Bureau of Land Management land. These sites include Little Cottonwood Canyon, Albion Basin, Provo Canyon and Rock Canyon.

Professional skier Matthias Giraud estimated that there are between 20 and 30 participants of ski-BASE jumping worldwide.

== Filmography ==
There are various films and documentaries that contain ski-BASE jumping. Some include:

- McConkey was produced by Matchstick Productions and distributed by Red Bull Media House. It was released in 2013 and includes segments of interviews from famous athletes such as Tony Hawk. The documentary details the life and death of ski-BASE jumper Shane McConkey.
- The Spy Who Loved Me is a 1977 film directed by Lewis Gilbert and produced by Eon Productions. It featured Rick Sylvester performing a ski-BASE jump from Mount Asgard as a stunt double for James Bond. The ski-BASE jump is included as part of the opening scene of the film.
- "History of Ski Base" - Red Bull Ultimate Rush season 1 episode 7. The documentary episode is produced by Red Bull Media House and Matchstick Productions and focuses on the development of the ski-BASE jumping sport. The documentary notably focuses on the contributions of the two famous ski-BASE jumping participants JT Holmes and McConkey.
- 60 Minutes - "Taking on the Eiger". The 60 Minutes documentary aired on November 29, 2015, and features ski-BASE jumper JT Holmes completing the first ski-BASE jump at the cliff face of the Eiger, in Switzerland.
- In 2007, McConkey re-enacted the ski-BASE jumping opening scene from the 1977 film The Spy Who Loved Me and published the recording online.
- The first female to complete a ski-BASE jump, Karina Hollekim, starred in her biographical film 20 Seconds of Joy. It contains footage of her ski-BASE jumping career and was screened at the 2007 Banff Mountain Film Festival. The film received the People's Choice Award against over 53 other finalist films and the Best Film on Mountainsports Award. The German film was directed by documentary filmmaker Jens Hoffmann and produced by Clenonice Comino.
- In 2012, media company Teton Gravity released a documentary featuring Erik Roner's ski-BASE jump in Macedonia, as part of the 2011 ski film One For the Road. The documentary is featured within season 4 episode 8 of the series.
- In 2014, Stept Productions created the action film Mutiny, featuring professional American freestyle skier Mike Wilson ski-BASE jumping from the Perrine Bridge in Idaho.

== See also ==
- Extreme skiing
- Ski flying
- Ski jumping
