= Aiguille de la Vanoise =

Mountain in France

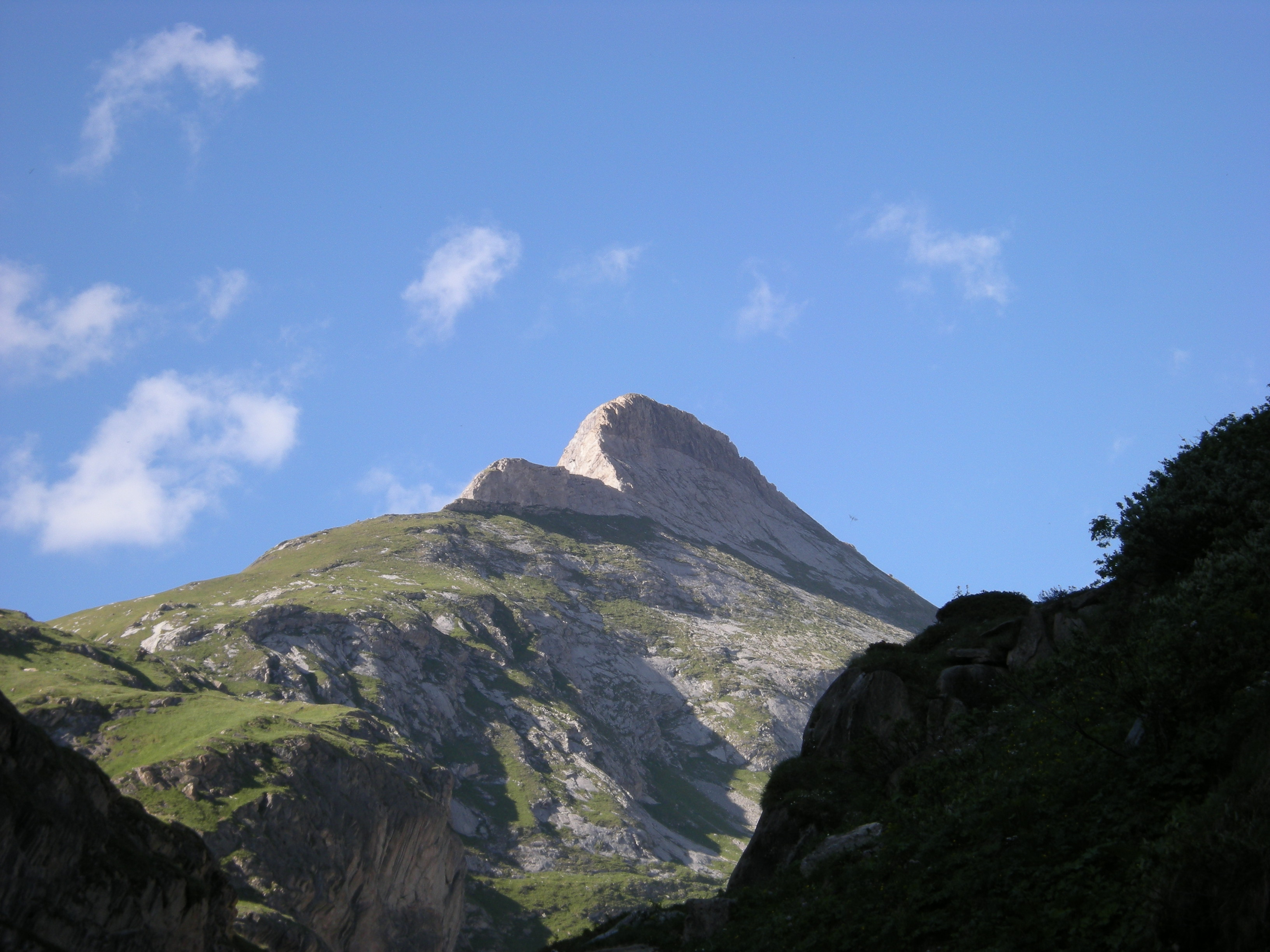

Highest point
- Elevation: 2,796 m (9,173 ft)
- Prominence: 249 m (817 ft)
- Isolation: 1.4 km (0.87 mi)
- Coordinates: 45°23′41″N 06°46′45″E

Geography
- Location within France
- Location: Savoie, France
- Parent range: Massif de la Vanoise

Climbing
- First ascent: 12 September 1911, by Marie-Antoinette Vernay with Marcellin Arniez
- Easiest route: The Ridges Traverse, AD (3c Max) from the Refuge du Col de la Vanoise

The Aiguille de la Vanoise is a mountain of Savoie, France. It lies in the Vanoise Massif mountain range in the commune of Pralognan-la-Vanoise. It has an altitude of 2796 metres above sea level and is known for its great North Face which is 300 to 400m high.

== Geography ==
The nearest town to the Aiguille de la Vanoise is Pralognan-la-Vanoise which is about 4 km in a direct line south-west of the peak. Pralognan-la-Vanoise can be reached by Highway D915 which runs east then south from Moûtiers. The highest mountain in the area is the Grande Casse of 3855m some 4 km north-east in a direct line of the Aiguille de la Vanoise. Other peaks in the area include the Grande Motte, the Dôme des Sonnailles, and Mont Pelve.

== History ==
The first ascent is credited to Miss Verney and Mr. Amiez on 12 September 1911 by the Traveerse of the Ridges, AD(3c Max).

It was René Desmaison and teammate André Bertrand who famously returned to this face and traced a very beautiful route on 13 July 1964. They were then followed by Paquier, the Tomio brothers, and Jean-Marc Boivin.

It was in 1984 that François Diaféra made the face look easy with the use of modern techniques of protection (climbing bolts and Pitons).

In January 1993, Lionel Daudet climbed the Hi Ginette (ED 6c, A2) alone in winter.

== Panorama ==
The Aiguille de la Vanoise is surrounded by mountains and offers a panoramic view of the Vanoise Massif, including the Grande Casse, the Pointe de la Réchasse, the Pointe du Dard, and the glaciers of the Vanoise to the east and south. To the west and the north the Pointe du Creux-Noir, the Pointe du Vallonnet, the Pointe du Volnets, the big and small Pointe de la Gliere, and the Pointes et aiguille de l'Épéna.

== Climbing routes ==
=== North Face ===
- Les larmes du soleil (Tears of the Sun): TD, 6a
- Tacos doudou : TD, 6a (in French)
- La ballade des joyeux marmottons (Ballad of Happy Marmots): D, 5b (in French)
- La grande Paquier : ED, 6b
- Salut Ginette (Hi Ginette): ED, 6c, A2
- La Desmaison: TD, 6a (in French)
- La fille aux yeux verts (The woman with green eyes): ED-, 6b
- Electrochoc: TD, 6b (in French)
- La petite Paquier: TD, 5c (in French)
- Voie bérard rigotti: D, 5b (in French)
- Missing Link : TD, 5c (in French)

=== South face ===
Bérard Rigotti way: D, 4b / c (2 steps 5b / c)

=== Traverse of Ridges ===
- Aiguille de la Vanoise: Traverse of the Ridges E to W : AD- (in French)

== See also ==
- Grande Casse (3852 m)
- Pointes et aiguille de l'Épéna (3421 m)
