= Refuge du Col de la Vanoise =

Mountain refuge in Savoie, France

Vanoise Pass Refuge
- Refuge du Col de la Vanoise
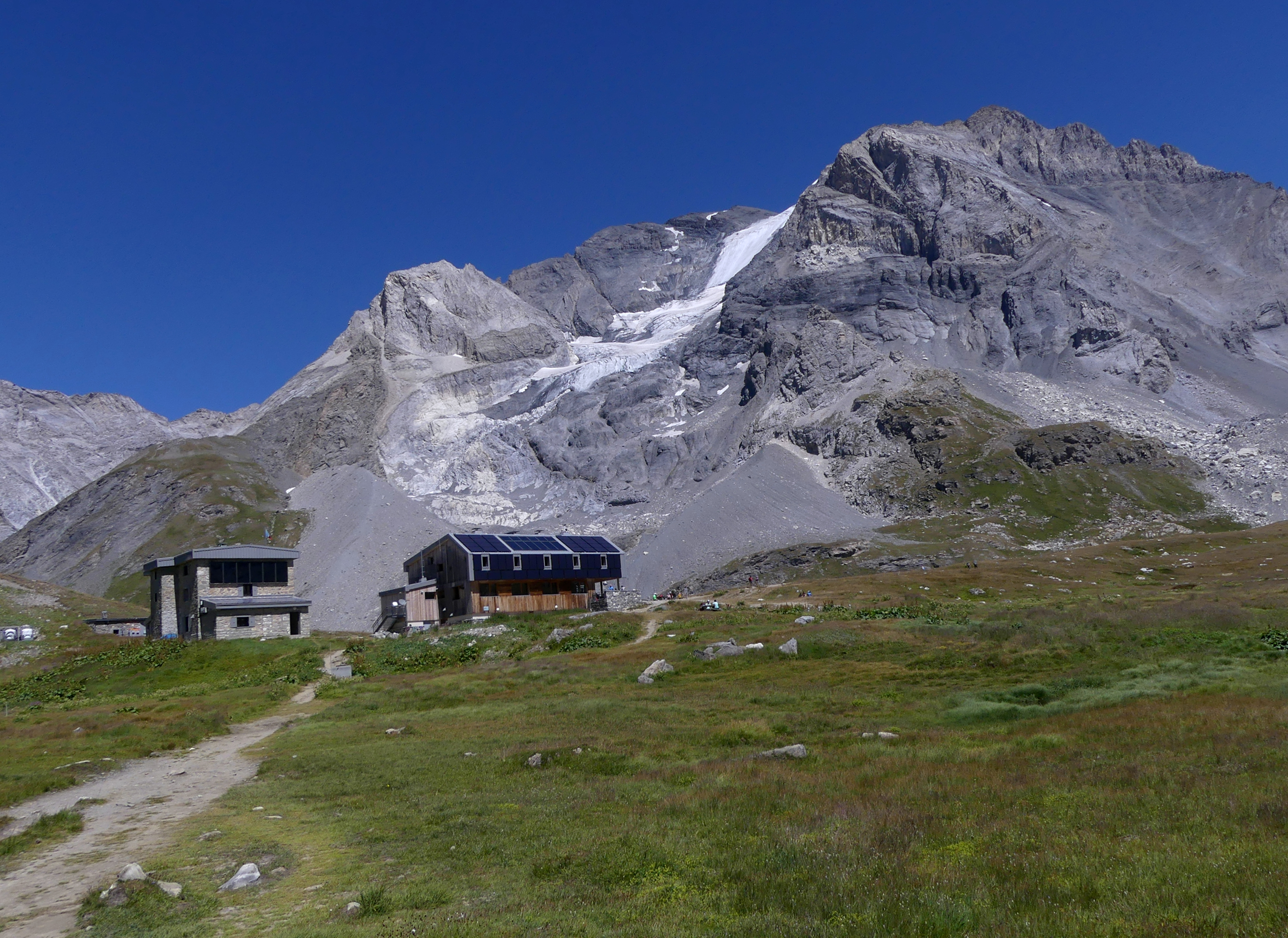
- The refuge in 2022

- Location within France
- Alternative names: Félix-Faure refuge

General information
- Location: France
- Coordinates: 45°23′31″N 6°47′28″E
- Elevation: 2,527 metres (8,291 ft)
- Owner: Fédération Française des clubs alpins et de montagne

Website
- refugecoldelavanoise.ffcam.fr

Refuge du Col de la Vanoise is a refuge in the Massif de la Vanoise mountain range in Savoie, France. It is also known as the Félix-Faure refuge, named after French president Félix Faure after his visit in August 1897.

The refuge was built near the highest point of the Col de la Vanoise mountain pass, 2,527 metres (8,291 ft) above sea level. It is situated at the crossroads between the Tarentaise and Maurienne valleys. Two buildings exist on the site: the Col de la Vanoise refuge, constructed in 2014 to replace two buildings constructed in the 1970s, and the Félix Faure building, a historic refuge built in 1902 and fully renovated by 2018. The refuge can accommodate 129 people between both buildings.

The refuge is one of the most visited in France, with 10,200 overnight stays in 2018. This increased to more than 14,000 overnight stays in 2023. To stay at the refuge, reservations are required. The refuge is owned by the Fédération Française des Clubs Alpins et de Montagne and has an exhibition room showcasing the site's history.
