= Charles Henri Durier =

French geographer

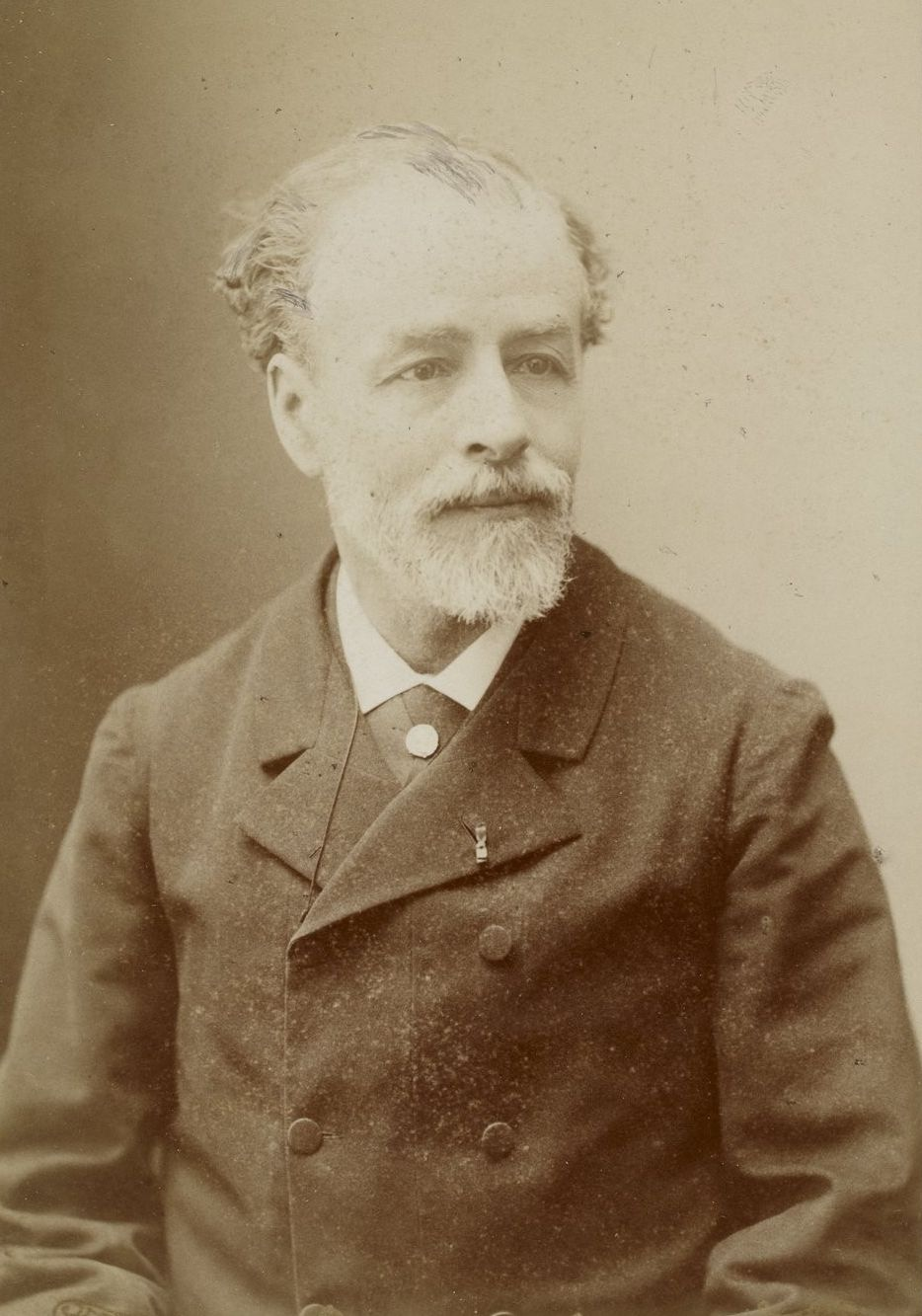
Charles Henri Durier

Charles Henri Durier (15 December 1830, in Paris – 6 May 1899) was a French geographer and alpinist.

During his career, he worked as an administrator in the Ministry of Justice, having the title of divisional chief at the time of his retirement. He was instrumental in the creation of the French Alpine Club (1874), serving as its president from 1895 to 1898. He was the author of a well-received book on Mont Blanc ("Le Mont Blanc", 1877), and of various short stories, novels and travelogues.

== Selected works ==
- Impressions de voyage en Russie, 1858 – Impressions from a voyage in Russia.
- Aux bains de Louèche, nouvelle, 1860 – Louèche-les-Bains.
- Miss Molly, 1869.
- Histoire du Mont Blanc, 1873 – History of Mont Blanc.
- Le Mont Blanc, 1877, 6th edition 1923.

== See also ==
- Durier Hut
