= Fédération Française des clubs alpins et de montagne =

Federation of clubs promoting mountain sports

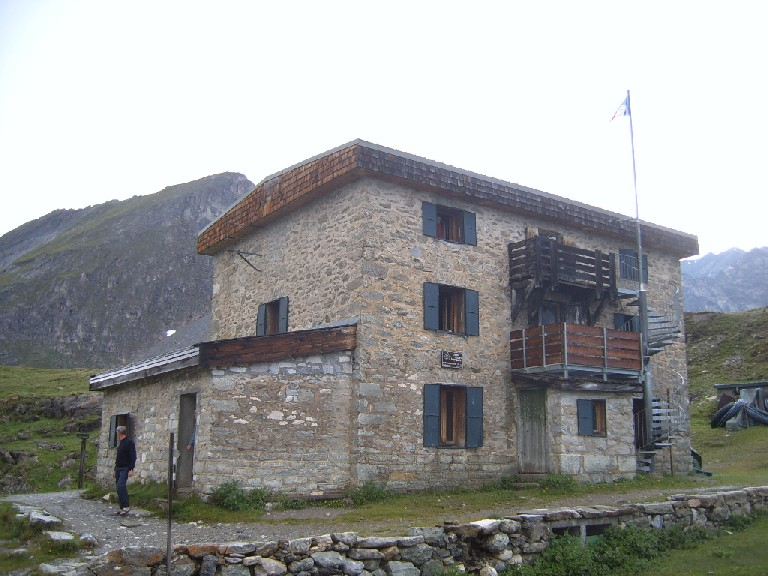
The mountain hut of the CAF at Col de la Vanoise

The Fédération Française des clubs alpins et de montagne (FFCAM) is a federation of clubs promoting mountain sports. It offers multiple training programs and courses to help people understand mountains and manages 142 mountain huts, mostly in the Alps and the Pyrenees.

It has evolved and grown greatly since its creation in 1874 as the Club alpin français (CAF). It was renamed on 30 January 2005 during its 5th congress, in Chambéry. It has become a sport federation with 430 affiliated associations, bringing together some tens of thousands of people in a single group. About 110,000 people are licensed through it to date. Regional and departmental committees relay the actions of the federation on a local level.

It is one of the founding members of the International Climbing and Mountaineering Federation (commonly known by the French name, Union Internationale des Associations d'Alpinisme, or abbreviation, UIAA).

== See also ==
- Swiss Alpine Club
- Alpine Club (UK)
