= Mountain sport =

Sports that take place in the mountains

Examples of mountain sport

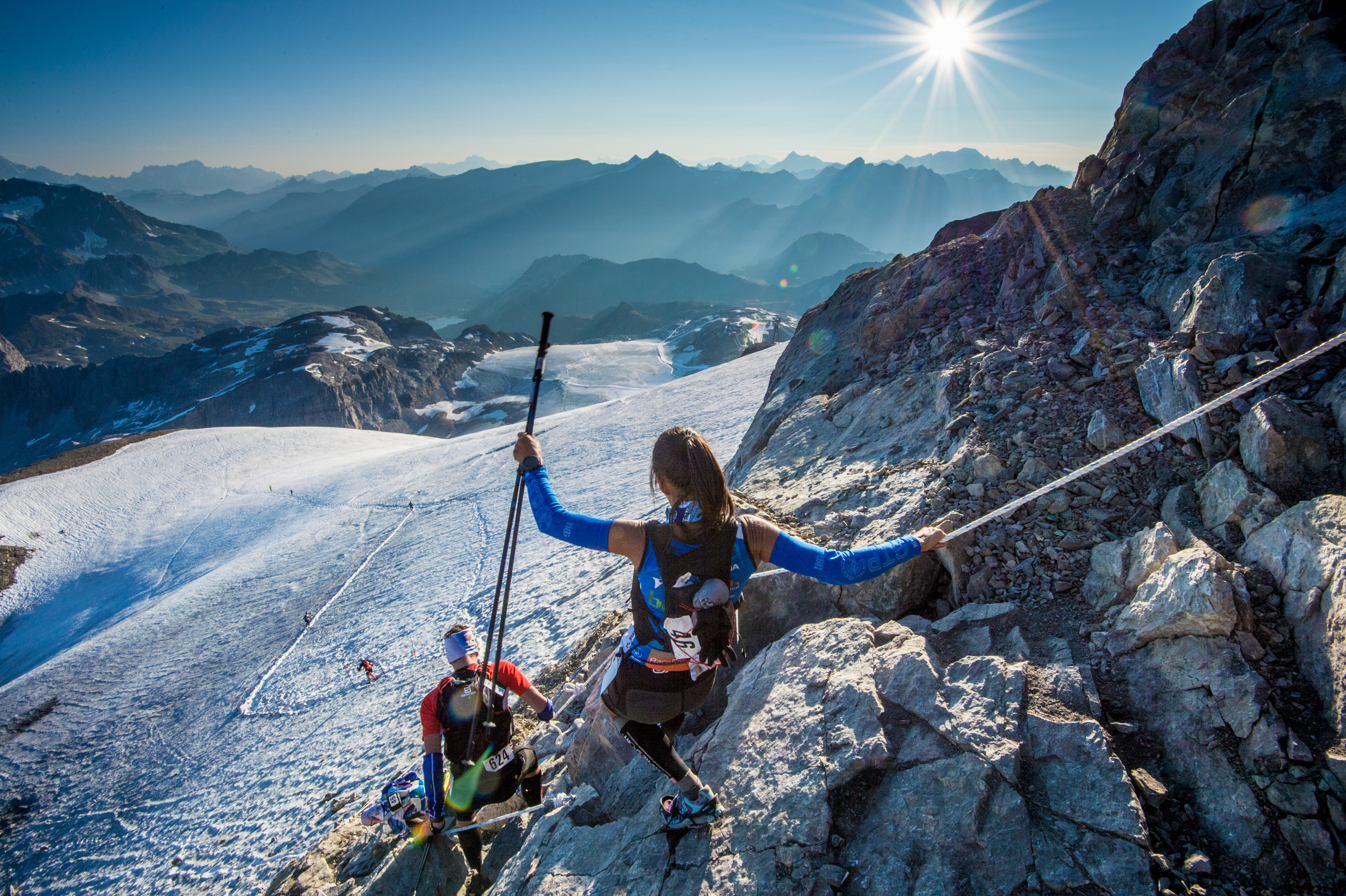
Skyrunning

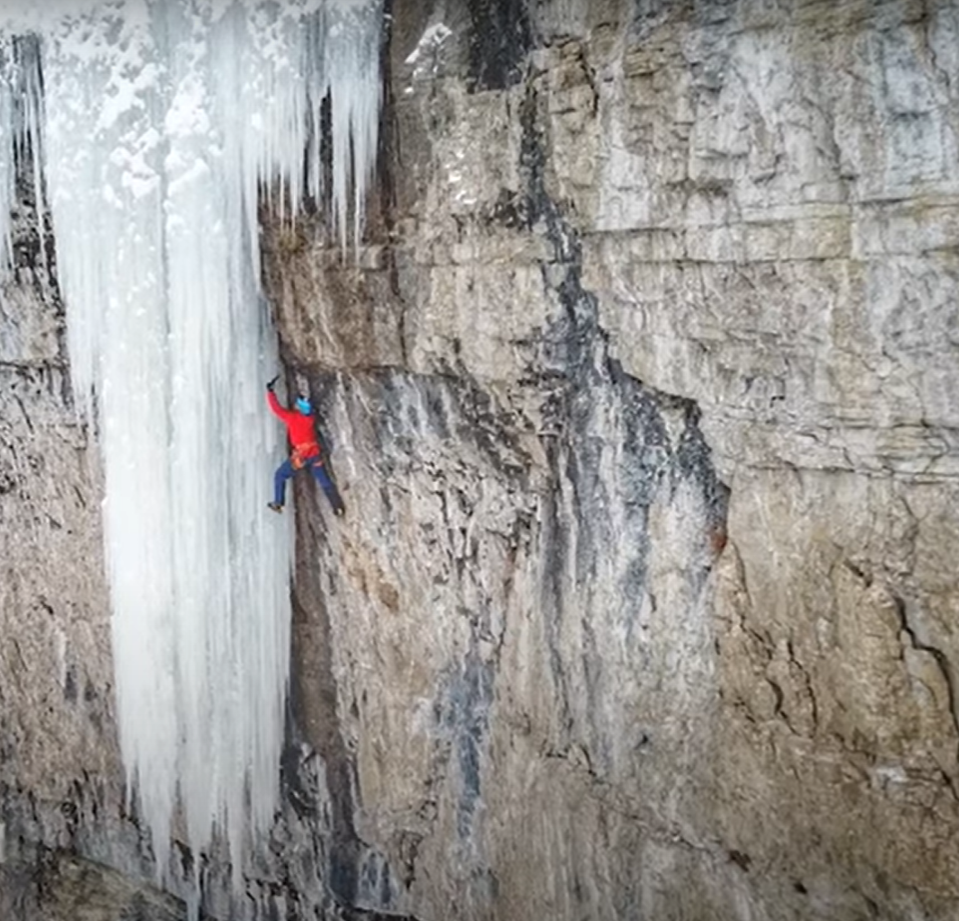
Mixed climbing

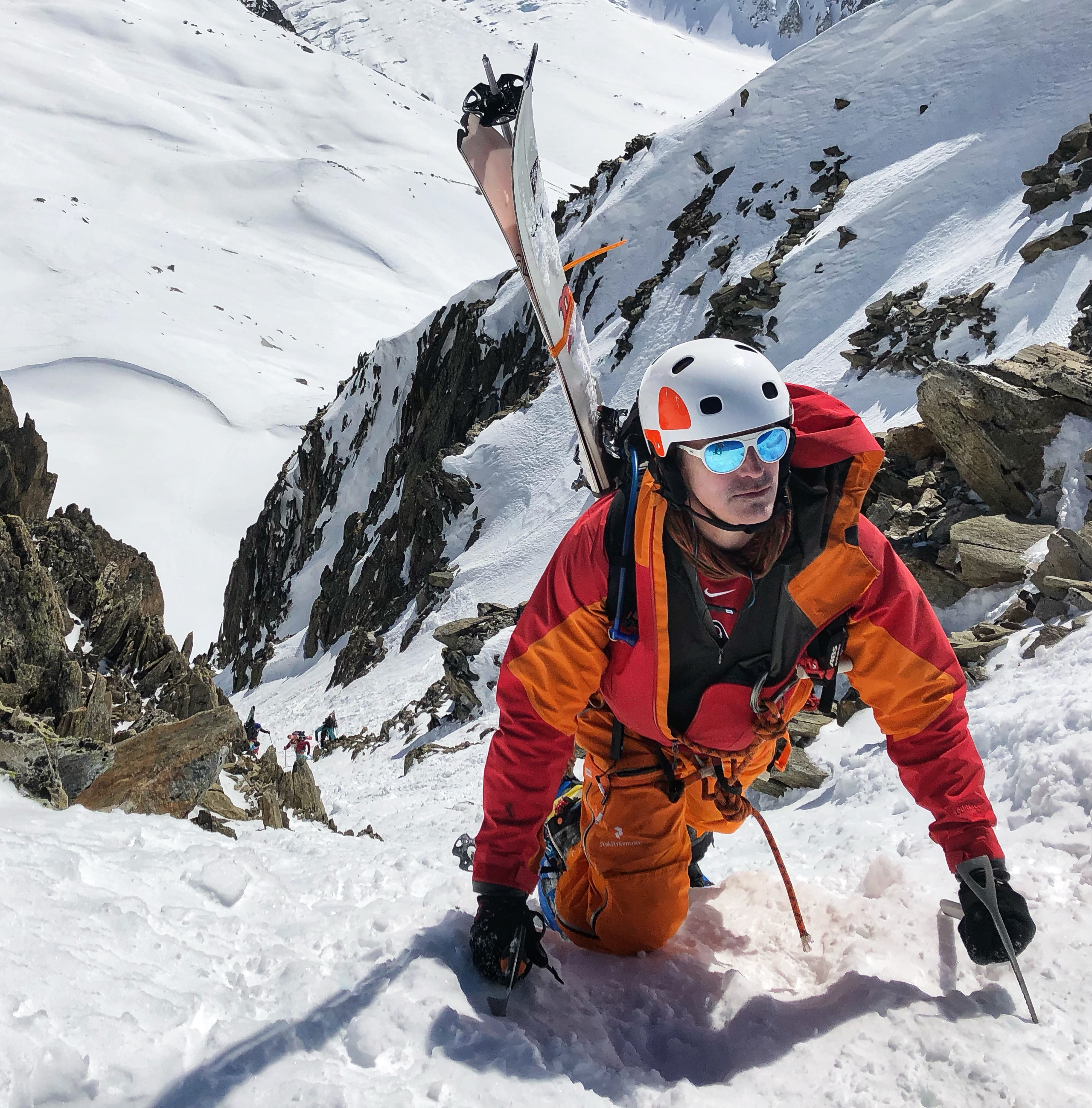
Ski mountaineering

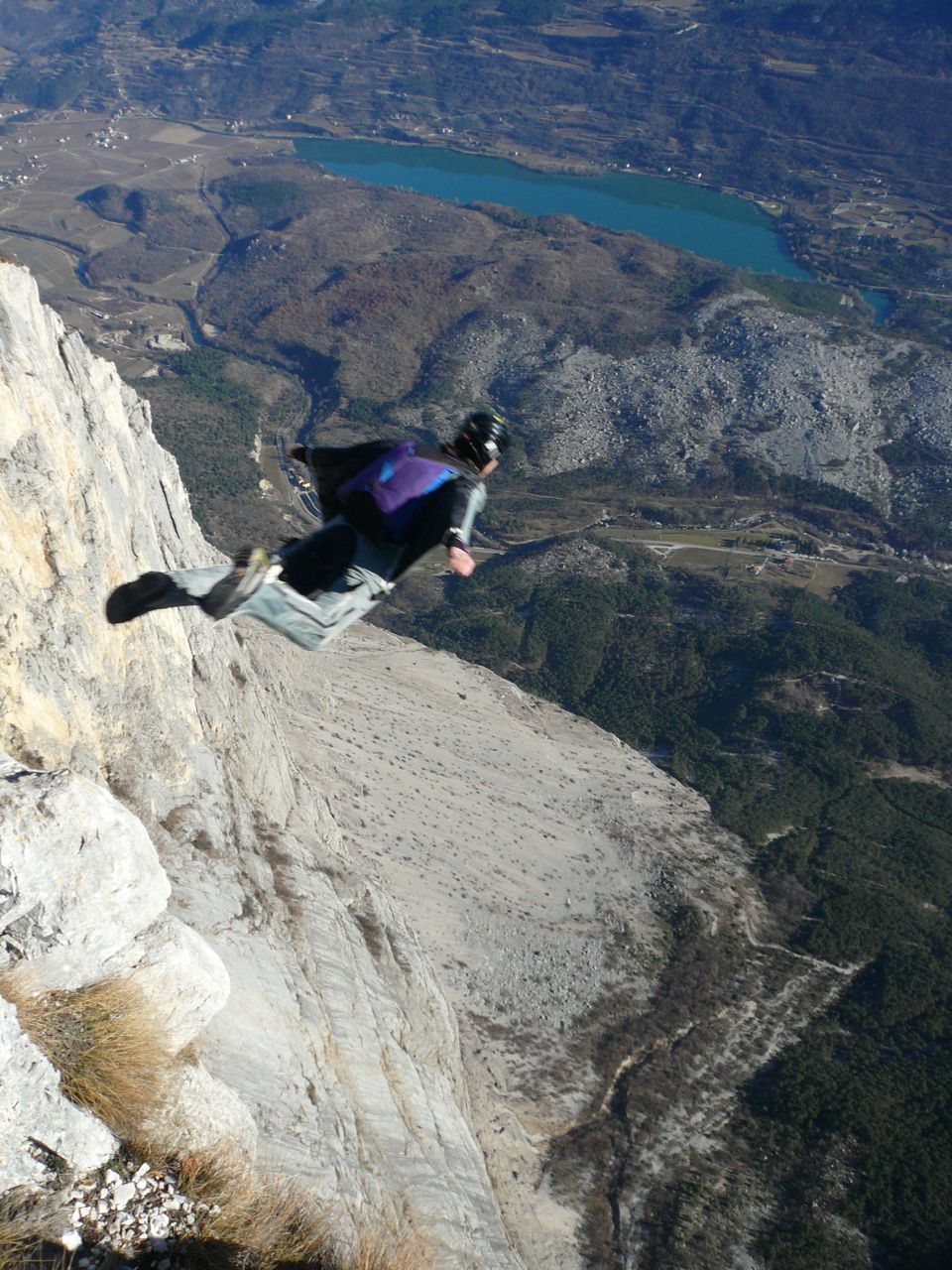
Wingsuit flying

Mountain sport or Alpine sport is one of several types of sport that take place in hilly or mountainous terrain.

Notable major classes of mountain sports (with sub-classes) include:

- Climbing-based: Mountaineering (including alpine climbing and expedition climbing), ice climbing (including mixed climbing and dry-tooling), rock climbing (including aid climbing, big wall climbing, and multi-pitch climbing), and Via Ferrata climbing
- Jumping-based: BASE jumping, hang gliding, and wingsuit flying
- Skiing-based: Backcountry skiing, freeriding, ski-BASE jumping, ski touring, and ski mountaineering
- Walking/orienteering/running-based: Adventure racing, fell running, hillwalking, mountain marathon, scrambling, skyrunning, and trekking

Other specific classes of mountain-sport include:

- Canyoning
- Mountain biking

== See also ==
- List of sports
- Glossary of climbing terms
