= Aiguille Croche =

Mountain in Italy

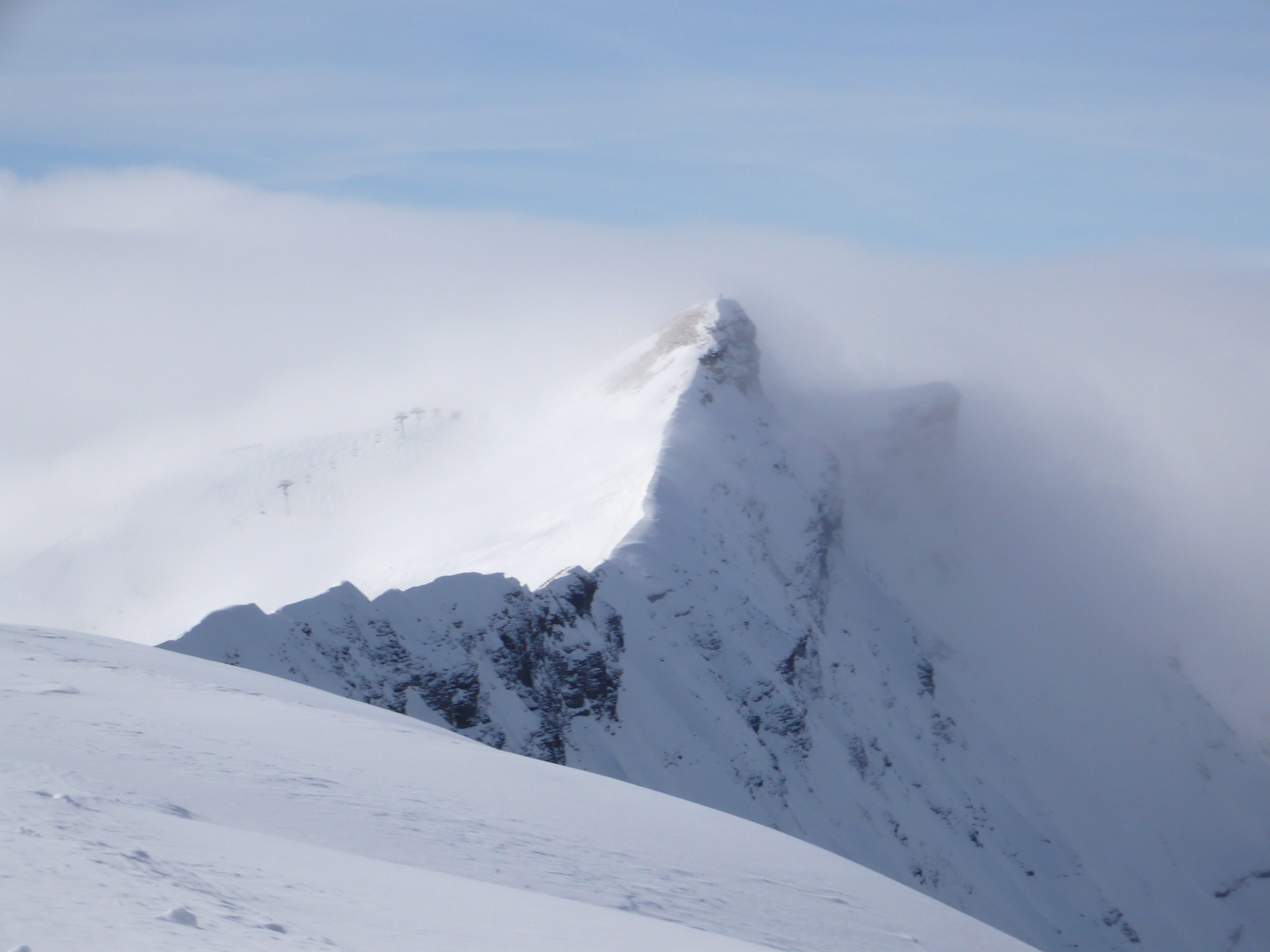

Highest point
- Elevation: 2,487 m (8,159 ft)
- Prominence: 133 m (436 ft)
- Coordinates: 45°48′01″N 06°39′33″E

Geography
- Location within France
- Location: Savoie and Haute-Savoie, France
- Parent range: Beaufortain Massif

The Aiguille Croche (2,487 metres (8,159 ft)) is a mountain in the Beaufortain Massif in Savoie and Haute-Savoie, France. In 2009, Matthias Giraud was the first person to descent and ski BASE jump off its cliff face.
