= Pointes et aiguille de l'Épéna =

Mountain in Savoie, France

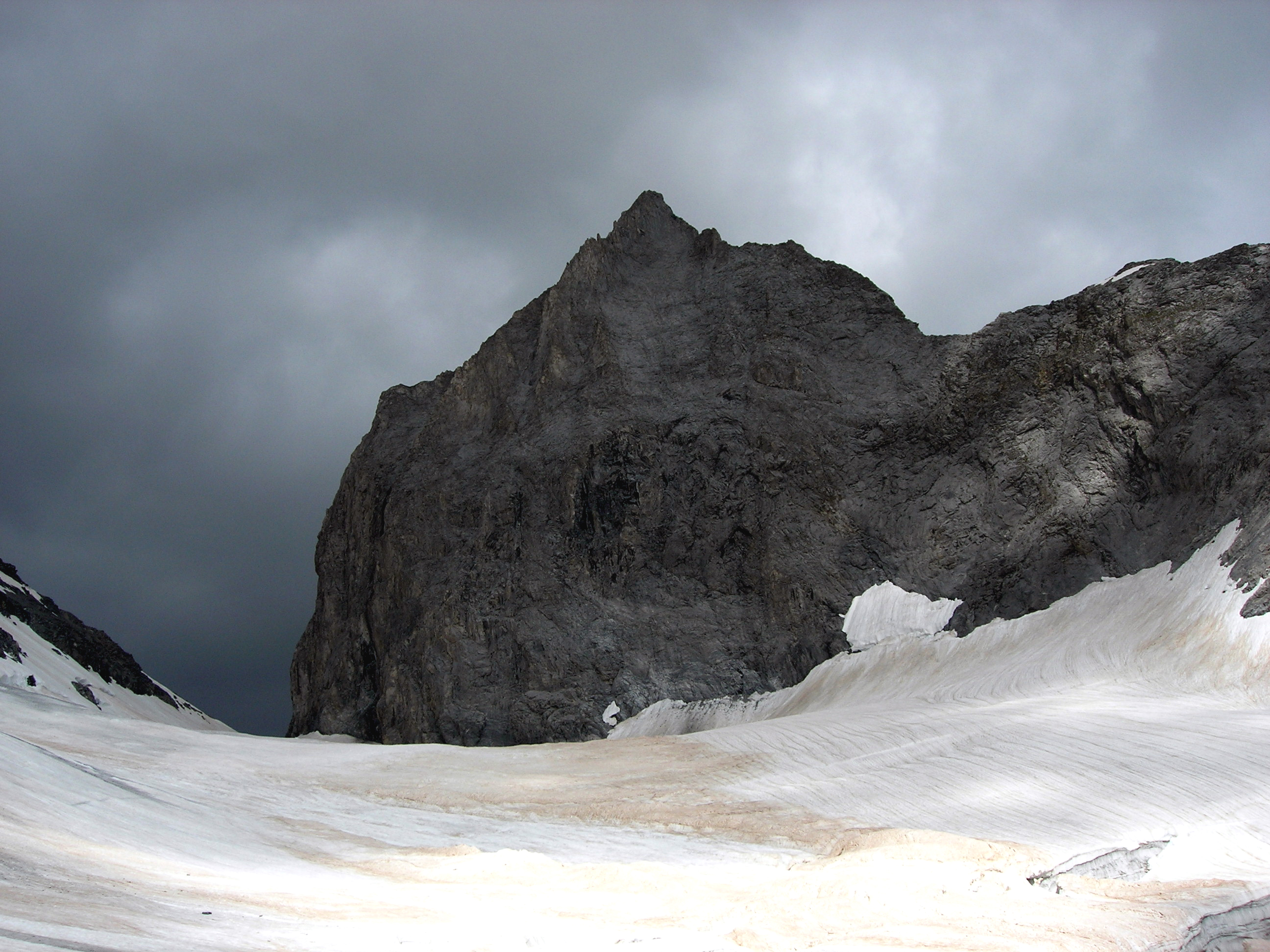

Highest point
- Elevation: 3,421 m (11,224 ft)
- Listing: Alpine mountains above 3000 m
- Coordinates: 45°24′51″N 6°49′02″E

Geography
- Location within France
- Location: Savoie, France
- Parent range: Vanoise Massif

Pointes et aiguille de l'Épéna is a mountain of Savoie, France. It lies in the Massif de la Vanoise range. It has an elevation of 3,421 metres above sea level.
