= Mike Wilson (skier) =

American professional freeskier (born 1986)

Michael David Wilson (born February 16, 1986) is an American professional freeskier. Wilson is recognized as one of the leaders of the freeskiing movement, and is known for pushing the limits by hitting bigger jumps and doing bigger rotations than almost anybody else. In 2004, Wilson introduced the first off axis double-flipping rotation to skiing (the "Wilsonflip"), revolutionizing freeskiing competition.

== Personal ==
Born in South Londonderry, Vermont to Beverly and David (Tuck), Mike is the middle of 3 children. He has an older sister Ashley, and a younger sister Robin. Mike spent his winters in middle school being homeschooled by his parents so he could ski. He attended high school in Manchester, Vermont for one year before transferring to The Winter Sports School in Park City, Utah. He graduated from high school in 2003, taking just longer than 3 years.

== Media ==
Mike's appearances in ski movies include “Seven Sunny Days”, “Push/Pull”, “The Hit List”, “Yearbook”, “Focused”, “Corduroy”, “Teddy Bear Crisis”, “Happy Happy”, “Lifted”, “Superpark, the Movie 2”, “Ready, Fire, Aim”, “Stereotype”, and “Salad Days,” among others.

Ski publications in which he has appeared include Ski, Skiing, Freeskier, Powder, SBC Skier, Freeze, Axis, 2 Freeski, Skiing (the next level), BravoSki, and Freestyle Ski. Mike has also written articles covering events and equipment for many of these magazines.

Mike also appeared on Good Morning America, which showed clips of him training at the Utah Olympic Park, as well as in a Jeep commercial in which he does a superman front flip across a road gap.

Mike has recently been working on "cross training" videos that feature extreme stunts. The videos can be found on Mike's affiliate website shreddytimes.com.
