= Matthias Giraud =

French skier

Matthias Giraud also known as "Super Frenchie" (born on September 24, 1983) is a professional skier and B.A.S.E. jumper. He was born in Évreux, France and grew up skiing at St. Gervais-les-Bains/Megeve, France. His first highly publicized accomplishment was the first ski B.A.S.E. jump off Mississippi Head on Mount Hood, Oregon. Giraud started as a competitive ski racer, but moved on to freeskiing and later on big mountain skiing. Giraud is known for combining BASE jumping with skiing and completed several first descents and ski BASE jumps across the globe including the first ski BASE jump off the Matterhorn in Switzerland. Giraud currently lives in Bend, Oregon.

The 2021 documentary Super Frenchie follows Giraud's career over the past decade, starting with his first ski base jump at Oregon's Mount Hood and leading up to a near-fatal accident in 2012, just days before his son was born.
