= Col de la Vanoise =

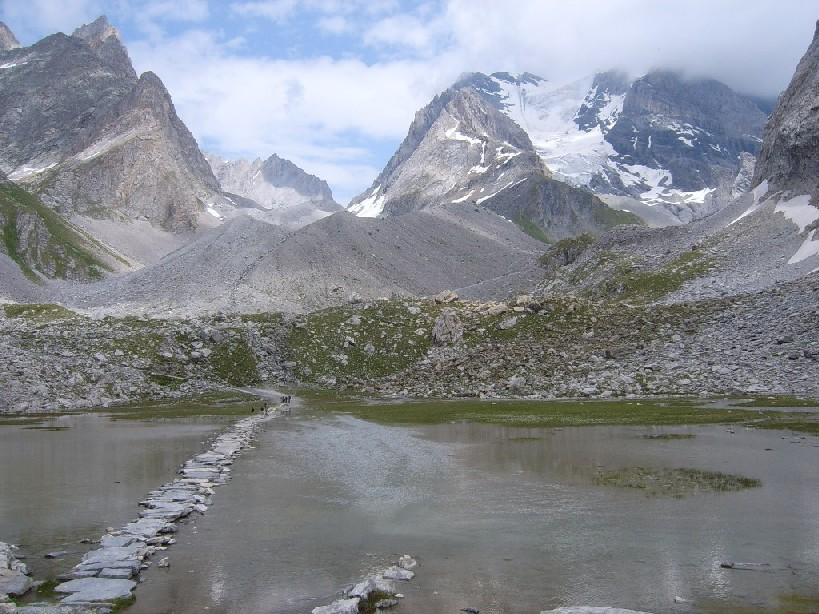

Highest point
- Elevation: 2,522 m (8,274 ft)
- Coordinates: 45°23′25″N 06°47′42″E

Geography
- Location within France
- Location: Savoie, France
- Parent range: Massif de la Vanoise

Col de la Vanoise is a mountain pass of Savoie, France. It lies in the Massif de la Vanoise range. It has an elevation of 2,522 metres above sea level.
