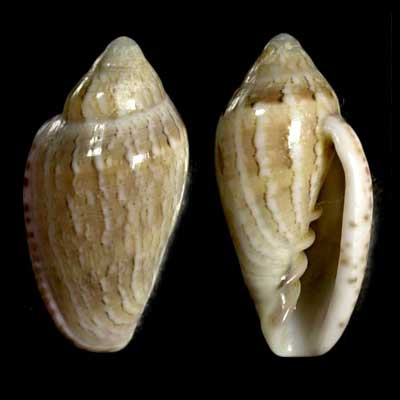
- Apertural (right) and abapertural (left) views of a shell of M. cosmia

Scientific classification
- Kingdom: Animalia
- Phylum: Mollusca
- Class: Gastropoda
- Subclass: Caenogastropoda
- Order: Neogastropoda
- Family: Marginellidae
- Genus: Marginella
- Species: M. cosmia

Binomial name
- Marginella cosmia Bartsch, 1915

= Marginella cosmia =

Species of gastropod

Marginella cosmia is a species of sea snail, a marine gastropod mollusk in the family Marginellidae, the margin snails.
