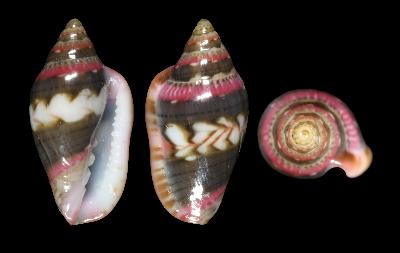
- Shell of Marginella britoi (holotype in MNHN, Paris)

Scientific classification
- Kingdom: Animalia
- Phylum: Mollusca
- Class: Gastropoda
- Subclass: Caenogastropoda
- Order: Neogastropoda
- Family: Marginellidae
- Genus: Marginella
- Species: M. britoi

Binomial name
- Marginella britoi Rolán & Gori, 2014

= Marginella britoi =

Species of gastropod

Marginella britoi is a species of sea snail, a marine gastropod mollusc in the family Marginellidae, the marginellids.

== Description ==
The length of the shell attains 12.2 mm.

== Distribution ==
This marine species occurs endemic to São Tomé and Príncipe Islands, Gulf of Guinea, Central Africa.
