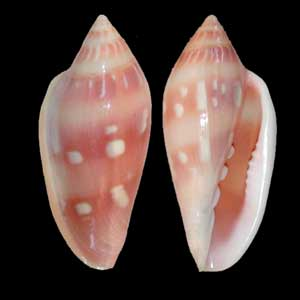
- Apertural (right) and abapertural (left) views of a shell of M. desjardini

Scientific classification
- Kingdom: Animalia
- Phylum: Mollusca
- Class: Gastropoda
- Subclass: Caenogastropoda
- Order: Neogastropoda
- Family: Marginellidae
- Genus: Marginella
- Species: M. desjardini

Binomial name
- Marginella desjardini Marche-Marchad, 1957

Synonyms
- Marginella (Marginella) desjardini Marche-Marchad, 1957· accepted, alternate representation

= Marginella desjardini =

Species of gastropod

Marginella desjardini is a species of sea snail, a marine gastropod mollusk in the family Marginellidae, the margin snails.

== Description ==
The shell has a distinct reddish pink colour, with an obovate shape and light spots around the exterior. The lip around the aperture has distinct ridges. This species attains a length of 72 mm.

== Distribution ==
This marine species occurs in Eastern Atlantic waters, off Senegal, West Africa.
