= Marginella lussii =

Scientific classification
- Kingdom: Animalia
- Phylum: Mollusca
- Class: Gastropoda
- Subclass: Caenogastropoda
- Order: Neogastropoda
- Family: Marginellidae
- Genus: Marginella
- Species: M. lussii

Binomial name
- Marginella lussii Hayes & Millard, 1995

Synonyms
- Marginella ornata serpentina Jousseaume, 1875; Marginella serpentina Jousseaume, 1875

Species of gastropod

Marginella lussii is a species of sea snail, a marine gastropod mollusk in the family Marginellidae, the margin snails.
