= Marginella purpurea =

Scientific classification
- Kingdom: Animalia
- Phylum: Mollusca
- Class: Gastropoda
- Subclass: Caenogastropoda
- Order: Neogastropoda
- Family: Marginellidae
- Genus: Marginella
- Species: M. purpurea

Binomial name
- Marginella purpurea Cossignani, 2006

Species of gastropod

Marginella purpurea is a species of sea snail, a marine gastropod mollusc in the family Marginellidae, the margin snails.
