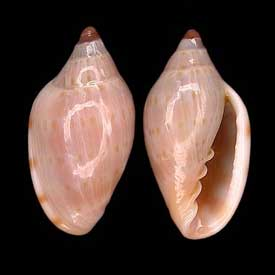
- marginella caterinae

Scientific classification
- Kingdom: Animalia
- Phylum: Mollusca
- Class: Gastropoda
- Subclass: Caenogastropoda
- Order: Neogastropoda
- Family: Marginellidae
- Genus: Marginella
- Species: M. caterinae

Binomial name
- Marginella caterinae Bozzetti, 1991

= Marginella caterinae =

Species of gastropod

Marginella caterinae is a species of sea snail, a marine gastropod mollusk in the family Marginellidae, the margin snails.

== Description ==
Original description: "The shell is fusiform in shape, and small in size for its genus. Protoconch consisting of about 1.5 whorls, and the teleoconch counts 3.5 whorls, which are slightly convex, and distinctly sutured. Surface is glossy and smooth. The outer lip is almost parallel to shell-axis, having a thick and raised varix which becomes narrower at the anal-notch level; its interior edge is finely denticulate; the central teeth are more developed, with the external two being still more produced, before defining respectively the anterior and posterior sinum.
Syphonal aperture is wide and rounded, inner lip bearing four strong columellar folds on the anterior half; first two of these are obliquely disposed with the fourth one being almost perpendicular.
The aperture is wide, becoming progressively narrower towards the apex.
Protoconch is tan-orange coloured, while the entire shell ground colour is creamy-pink; spire decorated with two rows of small brown dots above and below the suture and the last whorl is encircled with five, equally spaced rows of brown dots, these corresponding to darker brown spots on the external thickness of outer lip. Peristome and columellar folds are ivory white, inside of the aperture is tan-yellowish, deeper towards the anterior end."

== Distribution ==
Locus typicus: "Off Cape Guardafui, North-eastern Somalia, Western Indian Ocean."
