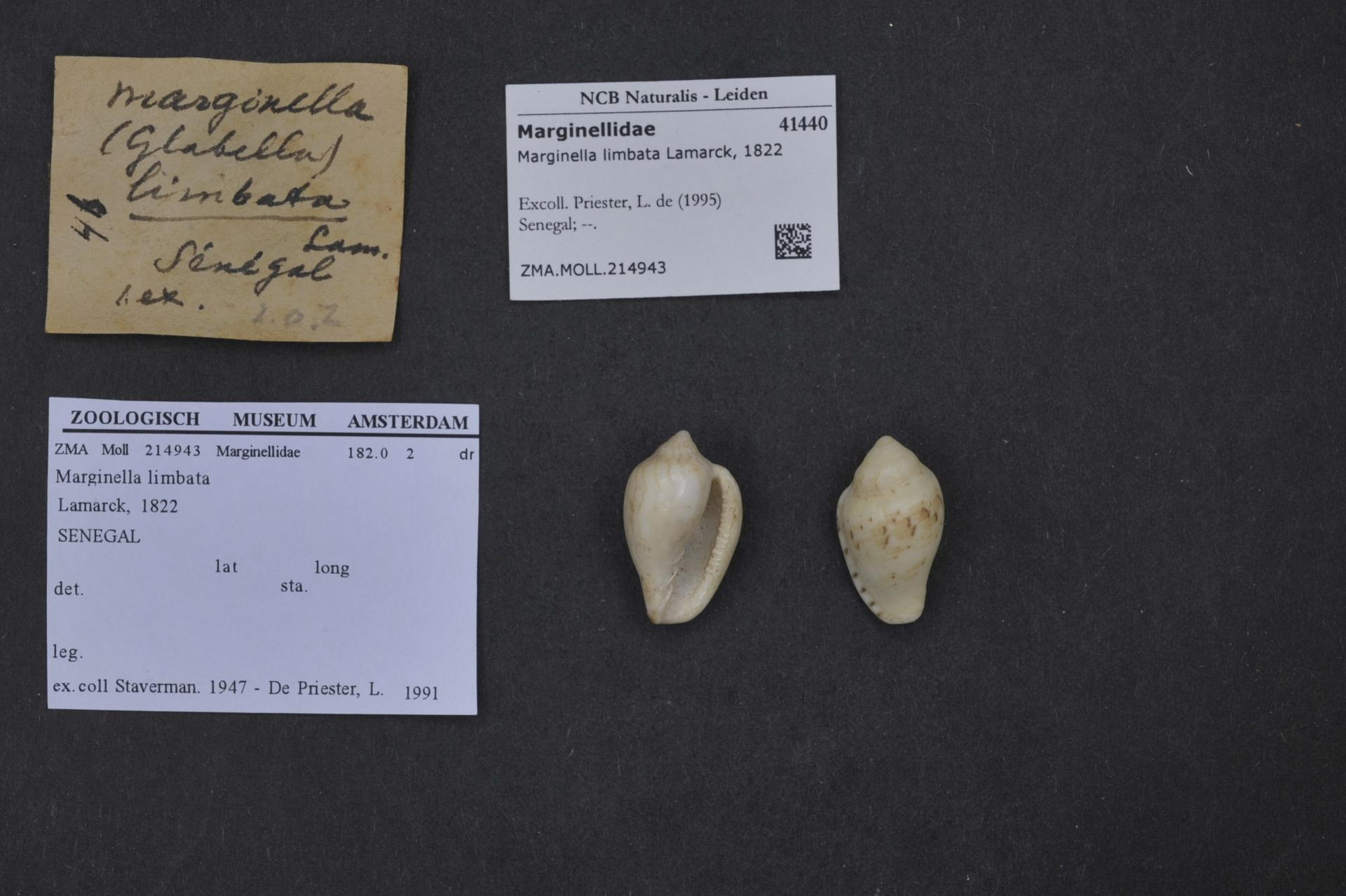

Scientific classification
- Kingdom: Animalia
- Phylum: Mollusca
- Class: Gastropoda
- Subclass: Caenogastropoda
- Order: Neogastropoda
- Family: Marginellidae
- Genus: Marginella
- Species: M. limbata

Binomial name
- Marginella limbata Lamarck, 1822

= Marginella limbata =

Species of gastropod

Marginella limbata is a species of sea snail, a marine gastropod mollusc in the family Marginellidae, the margin snails.
