= Marginella munda =

Scientific classification
- Kingdom: Animalia
- Phylum: Mollusca
- Class: Gastropoda
- Subclass: Caenogastropoda
- Order: Neogastropoda
- Family: Marginellidae
- Genus: Marginella
- Species: M. munda

Binomial name
- Marginella munda E.A. Smith, 1904

Synonyms
- Marginella munda f. unifasciata Turton, 1932; Marginella unifasciata Turton, 1932

Species of gastropod

Marginella munda is a species of sea snail, a marine gastropod mollusk in the family Marginellidae, the margin snails.
