= Marginella senegalensis =

Scientific classification
- Kingdom: Animalia
- Phylum: Mollusca
- Class: Gastropoda
- Subclass: Caenogastropoda
- Order: Neogastropoda
- Family: Marginellidae
- Genus: Marginella
- Species: M. senegalensis

Binomial name
- Marginella senegalensis Clover, 1990

Species of gastropod

Marginella senegalensis is a species of sea snail, a marine gastropod mollusk in the family Marginellidae, the margin snails.

== Description ==
Original description: "Shell of large size for the genus, pyriformly ovate, solid. Entire shell is covered with nondescript pink to grey lace color pattern, leaving random open spaces of ivory color roughly triangular in shape, with two wide interrupted black spiral bands and 4-6 randomly placed fine black bands, also interrupted and composed mostly of black dots. Spire elevated, conical, consisting of four and one half whorls. Apex rounded. Aperture wide, extending four-fifths of the shell. Outer lip ivory in color and spotted with 15-20 pink and grey dashes, curved and slightly bent near the shoulder, distinctly reflected, mostly smooth with just a hint of denticles within. Four heavy oblique folds, equally spaced starting high on the columella." Shell size 30 mm.

== Distribution ==
Locus typicus: "20-30 kilometres offshore near Dakar, Senegal."

"Also found along the continental shelf,
from Spanish Sahara to Sierra Leone, West Africa."
