= Marginella pseudornata =

Scientific classification
- Kingdom: Animalia
- Phylum: Mollusca
- Class: Gastropoda
- Subclass: Caenogastropoda
- Order: Neogastropoda
- Family: Marginellidae
- Genus: Marginella
- Species: M. pseudornata

Binomial name
- Marginella pseudornata Bozzetti, 1992

Species of gastropod

Marginella pseudornata is a species of sea snail, a marine gastropod mollusk in the family Marginellidae, the margin snails.
