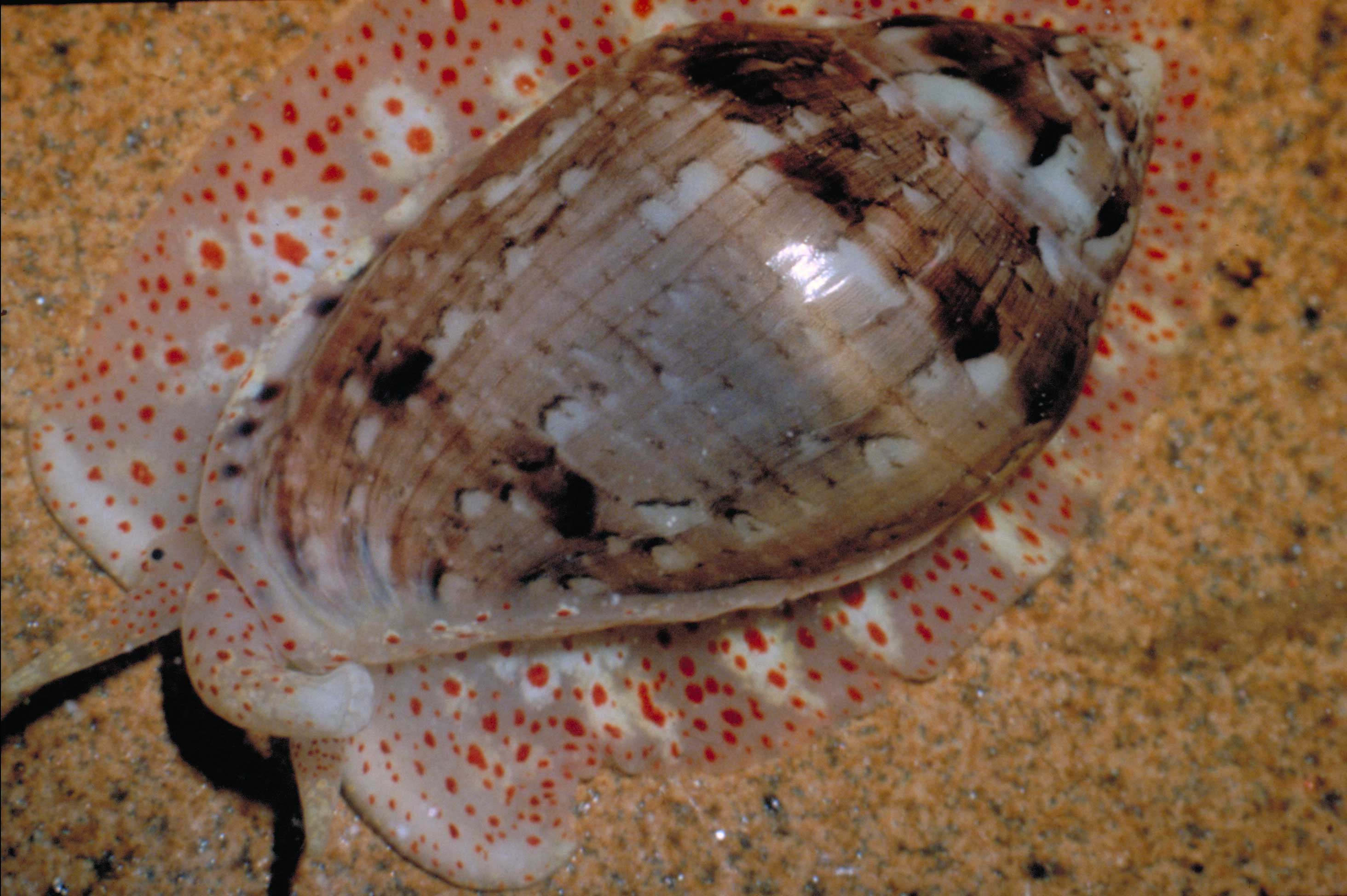
- A live individual of Marginella rosea

Scientific classification
- Kingdom: Animalia
- Phylum: Mollusca
- Class: Gastropoda
- Subclass: Caenogastropoda
- Order: Neogastropoda
- Family: Marginellidae
- Subfamily: Marginellinae
- Genus: Marginella; Lamarck, 1799

Species
- See text

Synonyms
- Cucumis Deshayes, 1830; † Denticuloglabella Sacco, 1890; Kaokomarginella S. G. Veldsman, 2017; Marginella (Afriamarginella) S. G. Veldsman, 2017· accepted, alternate representation; Marginella (Albamarginella) S. G. Veldsman, 2017· accepted, alternate representation; Marginella (Capensismarginella) S. G. Veldsman, 2017· accepted, alternate representation; Marginella (Fasciamarginella) S. G. Veldsman, 2017· accepted, alternate representation; Marginella (Grandamarginella) S. G. Veldsman, 2017· accepted, alternate representation; Marginella (Insulamarginella) S. G. Veldsman, 2017· accepted, alternate representation; Marginella (Kaokomarginella) S. G. Veldsman, 2017· accepted, alternate representation; Marginella (Lineamarginella) S. G. Veldsman, 2017· accepted, alternate representation; Marginella (Marginella) Lamarck, 1799 accepted, alternate representation; Marginella (Mordicamarginella) S. G. Veldsman, 2017· accepted, alternate representation; Marginella (Nataliamarginella) S. G. Veldsman, 2017· accepted, alternate representation; Marginella (Ovulamarginella) S. G. Veldsman, 2017· accepted, alternate representation; Marginella (Parvamarginella) S. G. Veldsman, 2017· accepted, alternate representation; Marginella (Piperamarginella) S. G. Veldsman, 2017· accepted, alternate representation; Marginella (Plicaustramarginella) S. G. Veldsman, 2017· accepted, alternate representation; Marginella (Praeparvamarginella) S. G. Veldsman, 2017· accepted, alternate representation; Marginella (Punctamarginella) S. G. Veldsman, 2017· accepted, alternate representation; Marginella (Pusillamarginella) S. G. Veldsman, 2017· accepted, alternate representation; Marginella (Roseamarginella) S. G. Veldsman, 2017· accepted, alternate representation; Marginella (Rubescamarginella) S. G. Veldsman, 2017· accepted, alternate representation; Marginella (Semidentamarginella) S. G. Veldsman, 2017· accepted, alternate representation; Marginella (Semiturriamarginella) S. G. Veldsman, 2017· accepted, alternate representation; Marginella (Senegaliamarginella) S. G. Veldsman, 2017· accepted, alternate representation; Marginella (Somaliamarginella) S. G. Veldsman, 2017· accepted, alternate representation; Marginella (Teresmarginella) S. G. Veldsman, 2017· accepted, alternate representation; Marginella (Textiliamarginella) S. G. Veldsman, 2017· accepted, alternate representation; Marginella (Venustamarginella) S. G. Veldsman, 2017· accepted, alternate representation; Marginella (Vittamarginella) S. G. Veldsman, 2017· accepted, alternate representation; Marginellana Adams & Adams, 1853; Marginellarius Duméril, 1806; Marginellus Montfort, 1810; Marginilla Swainson, 1831; Porcellana Gray, 1847 (invalid: junior homonym of Porcellana Lamarck, 1801 [Crustacea]); Pseudomarginella Maltzan, 1880; Roseamarginella S. G. Veldsman, 2017

= Marginella =

Genus of gastropods

Marginella is a very large genus of small tropical and temperate sea snails, marine gastropod molluscs in the subfamily Marginellinae of the family Marginellidae, the margin snails. It is a type of genus family.

The shells of species in this genus are rounded, smooth and glossy, with a large aperture that appears to be toothed because it shows the edge of the columellar folds. In many species the shells are colorful. The glossy surface of the shell results from the fact that the mantle covers most of the shell when the animal is active. As is typical in the Neogastropoda, the animal has a long siphon. When the animal is active, the foot extends much further out than the edge of the shell.

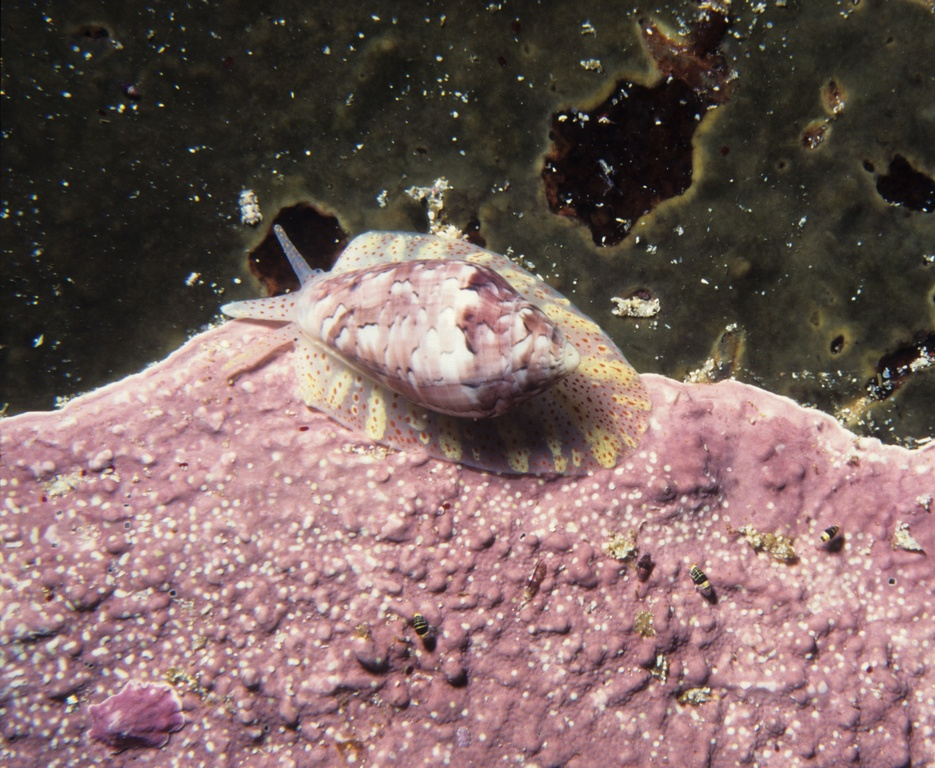
A margin snail with its mantle partly covering the shell

As is also typical for the Neogastropoda, species in this genus are carnivorous and also predatory.

== Etymology ==
Marginella means "little margin".

== Shell description ==
The shells of the species in this genus have spires which range from moderately elevated to flattened. The surface of the shell is glossy and porcellaneous, and it is often but not always colourful. The columella has four definite, subequal plaits on its anterior half. The outer lip is thickened, and generally denticulate inside, with distinct teeth or folds. The siphonal canal is not deeply incised.

There is no operculum.

== Description of the soft parts ==
In the living animal, the mantle only partly extends over the shell when the animal is moving.

The head is bifurcated, with slender tentacles and eyes in small bulges lateral to the base of tentacles. The siphon is large and protrudes over the head. The foot is large and flat, and when it is extended is slightly longer than the shell.

== Ecology ==
=== Distribution ===
This genus is found in tropical and temperate seas worldwide.

== Species ==
Species within the genus Marginella include:

- Marginella adamasoides Lussi, 2013
- Marginella adamkusi Bozzetti, 1994
- Marginella aequinoctialis Boyer & Simbille, 2004
- Marginella agadirensis T. Cossignani, 2022
- Marginella aikeni V. Veldsman & S. G. Veldsman, 2012
- Marginella albidens R. Aiken, 2019
- Marginella albocincta Sowerby I, 1846
- Marginella alborubra Rosado & Monteiro, 2015
- Marginella albospira S. G. Veldsman, 2013
- Marginella aletae S. G. Veldsman, 2024
- Marginella aliwalensis S. G. Veldsman, 2013
- Marginella almae S. G. Veldsman, 2024
- Marginella amazona Bavay, 1912
- Marginella amirantensis Boyer & Rosado, 2019
- Marginella anapaulae Massier, 2004
- Marginella angsanana K. Martin, 1921
- Marginella anna Jousseaume, 1881
- † Marginella antepiperata R. Aiken, 2020
- Marginella arcana S. G. Veldsman, Aiken & J. H. Veldsman, 2014
- † Marginella arena Cotton, 1949
- Marginella aronnax Bouchet & Warén, 1985
- Marginella aurantia Lamarck, 1822
- † Marginella aurisleporis (Brocchi, 1814) †
- † Marginella aurora Dall, 1890
- Marginella aurugo S. G. Veldsman, 2022
- Marginella bairstowi Sowerby III, 1886
- Marginella bavayi Dautzenberg, 1910
- † Marginella beberkiriana K. Martin, 1906
- Marginella belcheri Hinds, 1844
- Marginella benthedii Boyer & Rosado, 2019
- Marginella bicatenata Sowerby III, 1914
- Marginella blanco S. G. Veldsman & J. H. Veldsman, 2024
- Marginella boetveldsmani S. G.Veldsman, 2024
- Marginella bombus S. G. Veldsman, 2022
- Marginella britoi Rolán & Gori, 2014
- Marginella broderickae Hayes, 2001
- Marginella buffaloensis S. G. Veldsman, 2024
- Marginella caliginosa S. G. Velsdman & V. Veldsman, 2024
- Marginella carlae S. G. Veldsman, 2013
- Marginella carmenae Ortega & Gofas, 2019
- Marginella carquejai Gofas & Fernandes, 1994
- Marginella catenata Boyer & Rosado, 2019
- Marginella caterinae Bozzetti, 1991
- Marginella celestae Massier & Rosado, 2008
- Marginella celosia S. G. Veldsman, 2021
- Marginella chalmersi Tomlin & Shackleford, 1912
- † Marginella charma Cotton, 1949
- Marginella circumflexa S. G. Veldsman, 2021
- Marginella claustra Boyer & Rosado, 2019
- † Marginella clenchi M. Smith, 1936
- Marginella cleryi Petit De La Saussaye, 1836
- † Marginella clima Cotton, 1949
- Marginella cloveri Rios & Matthews, 1972
- Marginella colombi T. Cossignani, 2012
- Marginella colomborum (Bozzetti, 1995)
- Marginella confortinii Bozzetti, 1992
- Marginella confusa R. Aiken, 2019
- Marginella coovertorum S. G. Veldsman & J. H. Veldsman, 2022
- Marginella coronata Boyer & Rosado, 2019
- Marginella cosmia Bartsch, 1915
- Marginella croceus S. G. Veldsman, 2015
- Marginella davisae S. G. Veldsman, 2021
- † Marginella deshayesi Michelotti, 1847
- Marginella desjardini Marche-Marchad, 1957
- Marginella diadochus Adams & Reeve, 1848
- † Marginella dijki K. Martin, 1884
- Marginella dilucida S. G. Velsdman & V. Veldsman, 2024
- Marginella dimidiata Thiele, 1925
- Marginella donaikeni S. G. Veldsman, J. H. Veldsman & R. Aiken, 2016
- Marginella dyoseires R. Aiken & Seccombe, 2022
- Marginella edwardensis S. G. Veldsman, 2013
- Marginella elegans T. Cossignani, 2021
- Marginella elegantissima S. G. Veldsman, 2021
- Marginella elephantina S. G. Veldsman, 2013
- Marginella elioi S. G. Veldsman & J. H. Veldsman, 2024
- Marginella emmae Bozzetti, 1998
- Marginella epipolia Tomlin, 1921
- Marginella eucosmia Bartsch, 1915
- Marginella evansorum V. Veldsman, S.G. Veldsman & Aiken, 2012
- Marginella everriculum S. G. Veldsman, 2018
- Marginella exigua S. G. Veldsman, 2021
- Marginella falsebayensis V. Velsdman & S. G. Veldsman, 2012
- Marginella felixi Massier, 2004
- Marginella festiva Kiener, 1841
- Marginella fimbriata Boyer & Rosado, 2019
- Marginella fishhoenkensis Massier, 2004
- Marginella floccata Sowerby III, 1889
- Marginella florescopicturata S. G. Veldsman, 2024
- † Marginella formosa M. Smith, 1946
- Marginella fraserorum Aiken, 2014
- Marginella fulvocincta W. H. Turton, 1932
- Marginella fuscopicta W. H. Turton, 1932
- Marginella gabrielae Bozzetti, 1998
- Marginella gemma Adams, 1850
- Marginella gemmula Bavay in Dautzenberg, 1913
- Marginella gennesi H. Fisher, 1901
- Marginella geraldi Lussi, 2006
- Marginella gilva Goud & Neefs, 1996
- † Marginella giuntellii Sosso, Brunetti & Dell'Angelo, 2015
- Marginella glabella (Linnaeus, 1758)
- Marginella gloriosa Jousseaume, 1884
- † Marginella goncalvesi R. Aiken, 2020
- Marginella gonubiensis S. G. Veldsman, 2024
- Marginella goodalli Sowerby I, 1825
- Marginella gracilenta S. G. Veldsman, 2015
- † Marginella grissensis K. Martin, 1884
- Marginella groenewaldi S. G. Veldsman, 2024
- Marginella gustavoi Pérez-Dionis, Ortea & Espinosa, 2009
- Marginella harveyorum R. Aiken, 2019
- Marginella hayesi Bozzetti, 1993
- Marginella helmatina Rang, 1832
- Marginella henrikasi Bozzetti, 1995
- Marginella hernandezi Rolán & Gori, 2014
- Marginella himburgae Massier & Zettler, 2009
- † Marginella hordeacea Tate, 1878
- Marginella houtbaaiensis S. G. Veldsman, 2013
- Marginella huberti Clover, 1972
- Marginella humeronotata S. G. Veldsman & R. Aiken, 2022
- Marginella hybrida Cossignani, 2006
- † Marginella iberica Landau, La Perna & Marquet, 2006
- † Marginella ickei K. Martin, 1916
- Marginella ignifer S. G. Veldsman, 2017
- Marginella immelmani Hart M., 2001
- Marginella impudica P. Fischer, 1883
- Marginella irrorata Menke, 1828
- Marginella jeareyae R. Aiken & Seccombe, 2022
- Marginella jeffreysbayensis S. G. Veldsman, 2017
- Marginella joanae Bozzetti, 2001
- Marginella joanmassierae Bozzetti, 1992
- Marginella joostei Liltved & Millard, 1994
- Marginella keiensis S. G. Veldsman, 2017
- Marginella jucunda S. G. Veldsman, 2017
- Marginella kilburni Lussi, 2013
- Marginella lamarcki Boyer, 2004
- Marginella lateritia Melvill & Sykes, 1903
- Marginella lauriesmithi S. G. Veldsman, 2020
- Marginella leilaniae S. G. Veldsman, 2022
- Marginella lemaitrei Liltved & Millard, 1994
- Marginella leoi S. G. Veldsman, 2013
- Marginella limbata Lamarck, 1822
- Marginella lindae S. G. Veldsman, 2013
- Marginella lindaswartae S. G. Veldsman, 2024
- Marginella lineofasciata Bozzetti, 1992
- Marginella lineolata Sowerby III, 1886
- Marginella liparozona Tomlin & Shackleford, 1913
- Marginella lucani Jousseaume, 1884
- Marginella luculenta Gofas & Fernandes, 1994
- Marginella lussii Hayes & Millard, 1995
- Marginella lutea Sowerby III, 1889
- Marginella maculata S. G. Veldsman, 2013
- † Marginella mala Cotton, 1949
- Marginella malva S. G. Veldsman, 2021
- Marginella manzimtotiensis S. G. Veldsman, 2017
- Marginella mariaodetai Cossignani, 2010
- Marginella mariaodeteae Cossignani, 2014
- Marginella marimba Gofas & Fernandes, 1994
- Marginella marocana Locard, 1897
- Marginella martiae S. G. Veldsman, 2017
- Marginella mattavellii T. Cossignani, 2021
- Marginella mattheeorum V. Veldsman, S. G. Veldsman & Aiken, 2012
- Marginella mauretanica Boyer & Neefs, 1999
- Marginella mbotyiensis Aiken, 2014
- Marginella mella S. G. Veldsman, 2022
- Marginella melvilli Tomlin & Shackleford, 1913
- Marginella michelae T. Cossignani, 2012
- Marginella millardi Lussi, 1993
- Marginella miniroseolineata R. Aiken, 2019
- Marginella minuscula (Turton, 1932)
- Marginella mirandai Rolán & Gori, 2014
- Marginella monicae Bozzetti, 1997
- Marginella monozona Turton, 1932
- Marginella mooi R. Aiken, 2019
- Marginella mosaica Sowerby II, 1846
- Marginella mosterti S. G. Veldsman, R. Aiken & J. H. Veldsman, 2017
- Marginella munda E.A. Smith, 1904
- Marginella musica Hinds, 1844
- Marginella mzimayiensis S. G. Veldsman, Aiken & J. H. Veldsman, 2015
- Marginella nahoonensis S. G. Velsdman & V. Veldsman, 2024
- Marginella namaqua S. G. Veldsman & J. H. Veldsman, 2023
- Marginella natalcinerea Massier, 1993
- Marginella nebulosa (August Bolten in Röding, 1798)
- Marginella nevillana Kilburn, 1977
- Marginella nigromaculata S. G. Veldsman, 2017
- Marginella nimbosa S. G. Veldsman, 2013
- † Marginella nitidula Deshayes, 1835
- Marginella nkwaziensis S. G. Veldsman, 2017
- Marginella obliqua S. G. Veldsman, Aiken & J. H. Veldsman, 2014
- Marginella olearegina S. G. Veldsman, 2020
- Marginella olivarum S. G. Veldsman & J. H. Veldsman, 2015
- Marginella ornata Redfield, 1870
- Marginella orstomi Coomans, 1975
- † Marginella ovata I. Lea, 1833
- Marginella pachista Tomlin 1913
- Marginella palleukos Aiken, 2014
- Marginella parkrynieensis V. Veldsman, S. G. Veldsman & Aiken, 2012
- Marginella parvamaculofera S. G. Veldsman, 2024
- Marginella peelae Bozzetti, 1993
- Marginella perelegans S. G. Veldsman, 2021
- Marginella persicum S. G. Veldsman, 2017
- Marginella petitii Duval, 1841
- Marginella philipi S. G. Veldsman, 2013
- Marginella picturata G. Nevill & H. Nevill, 1874
- Marginella piperata Hinds, 1844
- Marginella pokkiae J. H. Veldsman & S. G. Veldsman, 2021
- Marginella ponderosa S. G. Veldsman, 2022
- Marginella pondo S. G. Veldsman, 2017
- Marginella poppei Boyer & Neefs, 1999
- Marginella praeacuta S. G. Veldsman & R. Aiken, 2022
- Marginella praeclara S. G. Veldsman, 2021
- Marginella procera Boyer & Rosado, 2019
- Marginella pseudocleryi T. Cossignani, 2021
- Marginella pseudodesjardini Le Béon, 2012
- Marginella pseudoglabella Mattavelli, 2018
- Marginella pseudopachista Aiken, 2014
- † Marginella pseudopoppei R. Aiken, 2020
- Marginella pseudornata Bozzetti, 1992
- Marginella pseudorosea S. G. Veldsman, 2013
- Marginella pseudosebastiani Mattavelli, 2001
- Marginella pulex Ortega & Gofas, 2019
- Marginella punctilineata E.A. Smith, 1899
- Marginella puniceus S. G. Veldsman, 2014
- Marginella purpurea Cossignani, 2006
- Marginella raybaudiae F. Boyer & Rosado, 2024
- † Marginella rembangensis K. Martin, 1906
- † Marginella reussi K. Martin, 1879
- Marginella richardsbayensis Lussi, 2013
- Marginella rosadialeukos Aiken, 2014
- Marginella rosea Lamarck, 1822
- Marginella roseafasciata Massier, 1993
- Marginella roseaflavescens S. G. Veldsman, J. H. Veldsman & Aiken, 2016
- Marginella roseolineata Turton, 1932
- Marginella rubescens S. G. Veldsman, 2017
- Marginella rubrocincta Turton, 1932
- Marginella rubrovittata S. G. Veldsman, J. H. Veldsman & R. Aiken, 2016
- Marginella rutila Boyer & Rosado, 2019
- Marginella sagena S. G. Veldsman, 2018
- Marginella salmorosea S. G. Veldsman, 2024
- Marginella san S.G. Veldsman, 2014
- Marginella schepmani Tomlin, 1916
- Marginella scitula W. H. Turton, 1932
- Marginella scusae T. Cossignani, 2023
- Marginella sebastiani Marche-Marchad & Rosso, 1979
- Marginella seccombei Wakefield, 2012
- † Marginella seguenzai La Perna & Vazzana, 2016
- Marginella senegalensis Clover, 1990
- Marginella sergioi Bozzetti, 1997
- Marginella shellyensis S. G. Veldsman, 2021
- Marginella signata Boyer & Rosado, 2019
- Marginella sima S. G. Veldsman, 2021
- † Marginella simplicissima K. Martin, 1879
- Marginella simulata Gofas & Fernandes, 1994
- Marginella singularis S. G. Veldsman, 2016
- Marginella slateri Lussi, 2017
- Marginella sodwanaensis S. G. Veldsman, 2021
- Marginella spadix S. G. Veldsman, 2016
- Marginella spengleri Aiken, 2014
- Marginella spinacia Gofas & Fernandes, 1988
- Marginella spiralineata B.Hayes, 1994
- Marginella squamosa Boyer & Rosado, 2019
- Marginella stellata S. G. Veldsman, 2022
- † Marginella stephaniae Pereira da Costa, 1866
- Marginella stephmani V. Veldsman & Aiken, 2012
- Marginella storea Boyer & Rosado, 2019
- Marginella stuarti Kilburn, 1977
- Marginella subturrita P. Fischer, 1883
- Marginella sulizeae S. G. Veldsman & J. H. Veldsman, 2015
- Marginella susanae Veldsman & Jooste, 2009
- Marginella svevae Cossignani, 2014
- Marginella tagaroae R. Aiken, 2019
- † Marginella tambacana K. Martin, 1884
- Marginella tentoria Lussi, 2013
- Marginella tenuiparva R. Aiken, 2019
- Marginella textilis S. G. Veldsman & J. H. Veldsman, 2014
- Marginella thos S. G. Veldsman, 2013
- Marginella tomlini Shackleford, 1916
- † Marginella tomuiensis MacNeil, 1961
- Marginella torpedo S. G. Veldsman, 2024
- Marginella trafalgarensis R. Aiken, 2019
- Marginella transkeiensis S. G. Veldsman, 2013
- Marginella trixiae V. Veldsman & S. G. Veldsman, 2013
- Marginella tugelaensis S. G. Veldsman, 2017
- Marginella tuguriana Lussi, 1993
- Marginella umgababaensis S. G. Veldsman, 2021
- Marginella umkomaasensis S. G. Veldsman, 2021
- Marginella umlaasiana S. G. Veldsman, 2017
- Marginella umzumbeensis S. G. Veldsman, Aiken & J. H. Veldsman, 2016
- Marginella undulans Gofas & Fernandes, 1994
- Marginella unifractistriata S. G. Veldsman & J. H. Veldsman, 2024
- Marginella valae S. G. Veldsman, 2020
- Marginella velai T. Cossignani & Ahuir, 2020
- † Marginella velata K. Martin, 1884
- Marginella velliesi S. G. Veldsman & Aiken, 2015
- Marginella venteri R. Aiken, 2019
- Marginella verdascai Hayes & Rosado, 2007
- Marginella verrilli Morrison, 1967
- Marginella vexillum Redfield, 1852
- Marginella vidalensis S. G. Veldsman, 2017
- Marginella viljoenae S. G. Veldsman, 2013
- Marginella violea R. Aiken & Seccombe, 2022
- Marginella vircula S. G. Veldsman, 2024
- Marginella visayae Mattavelli, 2021
- Marginella wallaceorum Lussi, 2013
- Marginella werneri Bozzetti, 1993
- Marginella westhuizeni Massier, 1993
- † Marginella woodsi Tate, 1878
- Marginella xhosa Liltved & Millard, 1994
- Marginella xoraensis R. Aiken, 2019
- Marginella zebroides S. G. Veldsman, 2013
- Marginella zigzag Seccombe & R. Aiken, 2022
- Marginella zulu S. G. Veldsman, 2017
- † Marginella zwartkopsensis R. Aiken, 2020

Species inquirenda
(species of doubtful identity needing further investigation.)

- Marginella claudoni Bavay, date unknown:
- Marginella delphinica Bavay, 1920:
- Marginella dispoliata Jousseaume, 1922
- Marginella lineatolabrum Gaskoin, 1840
- Marginella peasii Reeve, 1865
- Marginella scalariformis Duclos, date unknown:
- Marginella terverianella Bavay, 1922
- Marginella virgula Jousseaume, 1922:

Nomen dubium, i.e. a name of unknown or doubtful application

- Marginella granum Philippi, 1849:
- Marginella indistincta W. H. Turton, 193
- Marginella pyrrha W. H. Turton, 1932

== Species brought into synonymy ==
Extended list of synonyms
- Marginella abbreviata C. B. Adams, 1850: synonym of Volvarina abbreviata (C. B. Adams, 1850)
- Marginella adansoni Kiener, 1834: synonym of Glabella adansoni (Kiener, 1834)
- Marginella adela Thiele, 1925: synonym of Volvarina adela (Thiele, 1925)
- Marginella affinis Reeve, 1865: synonym of Volvarina affinis (Reeve, 1865)
- Marginella agapeta Watson, 1886: synonym of Gibberula agapeta (Watson, 1886)
- Marginella alabaster Reeve, 1865: synonym of Volvarina fauna (G.B. Sowerby I, 1846)
- Marginella albanyana Gaskoin, 1853: synonym of Hyalina lucida (Marrat, 1877)
- Marginella albescens Hutton, 1873: synonym of Volvarina albescens (Hutton, 1873)
- Marginella albida Tate, 1878: synonym of Hydroginella vincentiana (Cotton, 1944)
- Marginella albina Gaskoin, 1853: synonym of Mesoginella turbinata (G. B. Sowerby II, 1846)
- Marginella albino (Laseron, 1957): synonym of Alaginella albino Laseron, 1957
- Marginella albolineata d'Orbigny, 1842: synonym of Volvarina albolineata (d'Orbigny, 1842)
- Marginella albuminosa Dall, 1919: synonym of Prunum albuminosa (Dall, 1919)
- Marginella alfredensis Bartsch, 1915: synonym of Plesiocystiscus alfredensis (Bartsch, 1915)
- Marginella algoensis E. A. Smith, 1901: synonym of Crithe algoensis (E. A. Smith, 1901)
- Marginella almo Bartsch, 1915: synonym of Gibberula almo (Bartsch, 1915)
- Marginella altilabra May, 1911: synonym of Mesoginella altilabra (May, 1911)
- Marginella amabilis Redfield, 1852: synonym of Prunum amabile (Redfield, 1852)
- Marginella ambigua Bavay in Dautzenberg, 1912: synonym of Volvarina ampelusica Monterosato, 1906
- Marginella ameliensis Tomlin, 1917: synonym of Volvarina ameliensis (Tomlin, 1917)
- Marginella amianta Dall, 1889: synonym of Granulina amianta (Dall, 1889)
- Marginella amoena Suter, 1908: synonym of Dentimargo amoena (Suter, 1908): synonym of Dentimargo amoenus (Suter, 1908)
- Marginella amphitrite W. H. Turton, 1932: synonym of Cystiscus aphanacme (Tomlin, 1918) (junior synonym)
- Marginella amphora Laseron, 1948: synonym of Cystiscus angasi (Crosse, 1870)
- Marginella amydrozona Melvill: synonym of Balanetta amydrozona (Melvill, 1906)
- Marginella amygdala Kiener, 1841: synonym of Prunum amygdalum (Kiener, 1841)
- Marginella ancilloides Turton, 1932: synonym of Marginella piperata Hinds, 1844
- Marginella angasi Crosse, 1870: synonym of Cystiscus angasi (Crosse, 1870)
- Marginella anglica Leach, 1852: synonym of Trivia arctica (Pulteney, 1799)
- Marginella angolensis Odhner, 1923: synonym of Volvarina angolensis (Odhner, 1923)
- Marginella angustata Sowerby, 1846: synonym of Volvarina angustata (G.B. Sowerby, 1846)
- Marginella annulata Reeve, 1865: synonym of Prunum annulatum (Reeve, 1865)
- Marginella anticlea Dall, 1919: synonym of Dentimargo anticlea (Dall, 1919)
- Marginella anxia Hedley, 1909: synonym of Granulina anxia (Hedley, 1909)
- Marginella aphanacme Tomlin, 1918: synonym of Cystiscus aphanacme (Tomlin, 1918)
- Marginella aphanospira Tomlin, 1913: synonym of Plesiocystiscus aphanospira (Tomlin, 1913)
- Marginella apicina Menke, 1828: synonym of Prunum apicinum (Menke, 1828)
- Marginella asra Liltved & Millard, 1994: synonym of Marginella westhuizeni Massier, 1993
- Marginella atractus Tomlin, 1918: synonym of Alaginella atracta (Tomlin, 1918)
- Marginella attenuata Weinkauff, 1879: synonym of Austroginella translucida (G. B. Sowerby II, 1846)
- Marginella attenuata Reeve, 1865: synonym of Volvarina attenuata (Reeve, 1865)
- Marginella augusta Thiele, 1925: synonym of Prunum augusta (Thiele, 1925)
- Marginella aupouria Powell, 1937: synonym of Mesoginella aupouria (Powell, 1937)
- Marginella aurata Bavay in Dautzenberg, 1912: synonym of Gibberula aurata (Bavay in Dautzenberg, 1912)
- Marginella aurelia Thiele, 1925: synonym of Alaginella zeyheri (Krauss, 1852)
- Marginella aureocincta Stearns, 1872: synonym of Dentimargo aureocinctus (Stearns, 1872)
- Marginella auriculata Ménard de la Groye, 1811: synonym of Ringicula auriculata (Ménard de la Groye, 1811)
- Marginella australis Hinds, 1844: synonym of Mesoginella australis (Hinds, 1844)
- Marginella avena Kiener, 1834: synonym of Volvarina avena (Kiener, 1834)
- Marginella avenacea auct.: synonym of Prunum bellulum (Dall, 1890)
- Marginella avenella Dall, 1881: synonym of Volvarina avenella (Dall, 1881)
- Marginella barnardi Tomlin, 1919: synonym of Gibberula differens (E. A. Smith, 1904)
- Marginella baudensis E. A. Smith, 1899: synonym of Protoginella lavigata (Brazier, 1877)
- Marginella beali McGinty, 1940: synonym of Prunum beali (McGinty, 1940)
- Marginella becki Turton, 1933: synonym of Marginella piperata Hinds, 1844
- Marginella belangeri Kiener, 1834: synonym of Bullata bullata (Born, 1778)
- Marginella bella auct.: synonym of Volvarina lactea (Kiener, 1841): synonym of Volvarina abbreviata (C. B. Adams, 1850)
- Marginella bella auct.: synonym of Prunum bellulum (Dall, 1890)
- Marginella bellii Sowerby II, 1846: synonym of Glabella bellii (G.B. Sowerby II, 1846)
- Marginella beltmani Hart, 1993: synonym of Marginella peelae Bozzetti, 1993
- Marginella bensoni Reeve, 1865: synonym of Gibberula bensoni (Reeve, 1865)
- Marginella bernardi Largilliert, 1845: synonym of Cryptospira strigata (Dillwyn, 1817)
- Marginella beyerleana Bernardi, 1853: synonym of Volvarina avena (Kiener, 1834)
- Marginella biannulata (Fabricius, 1826): synonym of Volvarina bilineata (Krauss, 1848)
- Marginella bifasciata Lamarck, 1822: synonym of Glabella bifasciata (Lamarck, 1822)
- Marginella binotata Sykes, 1905: synonym of Dentimargo binotata (Sykes, 1905)
- Marginella biplicata Krauss, 1852: synonym of Hyalina perla (Marrat, 1876)
- Marginella biplicata Risso, 1826: synonym of Ringicula auriculata (Ménard de la Groye, 1811)
- Marginella bivaricosa Lamarck, 1822: synonym of Prunum marginatum (Born, 1778)
- Marginella bivittata Bavay in Dautzenberg, 1912: synonym of Volvarina ameliensis (Tomlin, 1917)
- Marginella blanda Hinds, 1844: synonym of Persicula blanda (Hinds, 1844)
- Marginella bojadorensis Thiele, 1925: synonym of Dentimargo bojadorensis (Thiele, 1925)
- Marginella borbonica Jousseaume, 1875: synonym of Dentimargo pumila (Redfield, 1870)
- Marginella borda Cotton, 1944: synonym of Alaginella borda (Cotton, 1944)
- Marginella borealis Verrill, 1884: synonym of Prunum boreale (A. E. Verrill, 1884)
- Marginella bougei Bavay, 1917: synonym of Cystiscus bougei (Bavay, 1917)
- Marginella brachia Watson, 1886: synonym of Mesoginella brachia (Watson, 1886)
- Marginella brocktoni Shackleford, 1914: synonym of Hyalina brocktoni (Shackleford, 1914)
- Marginella bucca Tomlin, 1916: synonym of Cystiscus bucca (Tomlin, 1916)
- Marginella bullula Reeve, 1865: synonym of Volvarina bullula (Reeve, 1865)
- Marginella burchardi Dunker, 1852: synonym of Prunum sapotilla (Hinds, 1844)
- Marginella burnupi Sowerby, 1897: synonym of Gibberula burnupi (G.B. Sowerby III, 1897)
- Marginella caducocincta May, 1915: synonym of Mesoginella caducocincta (May, 1915)
- Marginella caelata Monterosato, 1877: synonym of Gibberula caelata (Monterosato, 1877)
- Marginella cairoma Brookes, 1924: synonym of Dentimargo cairoma (Brookes, 1924)
- Marginella calameli Jousseaume, 1875: synonym of Volvarina mitrella (Risso, 1826)
- Marginella canaryensis Clover, 1972: synonym of Persicula canaryensis (Clover, 1972)
- Marginella candida Bivona Ant., 1832: synonym of Ringicula auriculata (Ménard de la Groye, 1811)
- Marginella capensis Krauss, 1848: synonym of Volvarina capensis (Krauss, 1848)
- Marginella caribaea d'Orbigny, 1842: synonym of Prunum apicinum (Menke, 1828)
- Marginella carinata E. A. Smith, 1891: synonym of Alaginella carinata (E. A. Smith, 1891)
- Marginella carnea Storer, 1837: synonym of Prunum carneum (Storer, 1837)
- Marginella carybaea Weinkauff, 1879: synonym of Prunum apicinum (Menke, 1828)
- Marginella castanea Dillwyn, 1817: synonym of Marginella aurantia Lamarck, 1822
- Marginella cernita Locard, 1897: synonym of Volvarina cernita (Locard, 1897)
- Marginella chemnitzii (Dillwyn, 1817): synonym of Glabella denticulata (Link, 1807)
- Marginella cherubini Bavay, 1922: synonym of Gibberula cherubini (Bavay, 1922)
- Marginella chrysea Watson, 1886: synonym of Hyalina perla (Marrat, 1876)
- Marginella chudeaui Bavay in Dautzenberg, 1910: synonym of Gibberula chudeaui (Bavay in Dautzenberg, 1910)
- Marginella cincta Kiener, 1834: synonym of Prunum cinctum (Kiener, 1834)
- Marginella cineracea Dall, 1889: synonym of Prunum cineraceum (Dall, 1889)
- Marginella cleo Bartsch, 1915: synonym of Volvarina bilineata (Krauss, 1848)
- Marginella columnaria Hedley & May, 1908: synonym of Hydroginella columnaria (Hedley & May, 1908)
- Marginella columnella Bavay in Dautzenberg, 1912: synonym of Gibberula columnella (Bavay in Dautzenberg, 1912)
- Marginella coma Odhner, 1924: synonym of Peculator porphyria (Verco, 1896)
- Marginella compressa Reeve, 1865: synonym of Volvarina compressa (Reeve, 1865)
- Marginella confortinii Bozzetti, 1992: synonym of Marginella epipolia Tomlin, 1921
- Marginella conoidalis Kiener, 1841: synonym of Prunum apicinum (Menke, 1828)
- Marginella consobrina May, 1911: synonym of Mesoginella consobrina (May, 1911)
- Marginella constricta Hinds, 1844: synonym of Prunum olivaeforme (Kiener, 1834)
- Marginella contaminata Gaskoin, 1849: synonym of Persicula blanda (Hinds, 1844)
- Marginella cracens Dell, 1956: synonym of Mesoginella cracens (Dell, 1956)
- Marginella crassa Röding, 1798: synonym of Prunum marginatum (Born, 1778)
- Marginella crassilabrum G. B. Sowerby I, 1846: synonym of Prunum labrosum (Redfield, 1870)
- Marginella crenilabra Bory de Saint-Vincent, 1824: synonym of Cryptospira strigata (Dillwyn, 1817)
- Marginella crescere Laseron, 1948: synonym of Alaginella ochracea (Angas, 1871)
- Marginella croukampi Hayes, 1996 : synonym of Marginella minuscula W. H. Turton, 1932
- Marginella cumingiana Petit de la Saussaye, 1841: synonym of Marginella helmatina cumingiana Petit de la Saussaye, 1841
- Marginella cuneata Laseron, 1948: synonym of Dentimargo kemblensis (Hedley, 1903)
- Marginella curta G. B. Sowerby I, 1832: synonym of Prunum curtum (G. B. Sowerby I, 1832)
- Marginella cuvieri Deshayes, 1853: synonym of Bullata bullata (Born, 1778)
- Marginella cylichnella May, 1918: synonym of Balanetta cylichnella (May, 1918)
- Marginella cylindrica G. B. Sowerby II, 1846: synonym of Hyalina cylindrica (G.B. Sowerby II, 1846)
- Marginella cylindrica Pease, 1863: synonym of Marginella peasii Reeve, 1865
- Marginella cypraeacea Bory de Saint-Vincent, 1827: synonym of Persicula cornea (Lamarck, 1822)
- Marginella cypraeoides Tenison-Woods, 1878: synonym of Ovaginella ovulum (G. B. Sowerby II, 1846)
- Marginella cystiscus Redfield, 1870: synonym of Cystiscus cystiscus (Redfield, 1870)
- Marginella dactylus Lamarck, 1822: synonym of Cryptospira dactylus (Lamarck, 1822)
- Marginella dawnae Liltved & Millard, 1994: synonym of Marginella natalcinerea Massier, 1993
- Marginella deburghi Adams, 1864: synonym of Persicula deburghi (A. Adams, 1864)
- Marginella decaryi Bavay, 1920: synonym of Ovaginella decaryi (Bavay, 1920)
- Marginella delessertiana Récluz, 1841: synonym of Hydroginella delessertiana (Récluz, 1841)
- Marginella deliciosa Bavay in Dautzenberg, 1912: synonym of Volvarina deliciosa (Bavay in Dautzenberg, 1912)
- Marginella delphinica Bavay, 1920: synonym of Dentimargo delphinica Bavay, 1920
- Marginella dens Reeve, 1865: synonym of Gibberula dens (Reeve, 1865)
- Marginella denticulata (Link, 1807): synonym of Glabella denticulata (Link, 1807)
- Marginella dentiens May, 1911: synonym of Dentimargo dentiens (May, 1911)
- † Marginella dentifera Lamarck, 1803: synonym of † Dentimargo dentifera (Lamarck, 1803)
- Marginella destina Schwengel, 1943: synonym of Dentimargo eburneolus (Conrad, 1834)
- Marginella diaphana Kiener, 1841: synonym of Prunum pellucidum (Pfeiffer, 1840)
- Marginella differens E. A. Smith, 1904: synonym of Gibberula differens (E. A. Smith, 1904)
- Marginella dimidiata Thiele, 1925: synonym of Marginella piperata Hinds, 1844
- Marginella donovani Payraudeau, 1826: synonym of Erato voluta (Montagu, 1803)
- Marginella dozei Mabille & Rochebrune, 1889: synonym of Volvarina dozei (Mabille & Rochebrune, 1889)
- Marginella dunkeri Krauss, 1848: synonym of Volvarina dunkeri (Krauss, 1848)
- Marginella ealesae Powell, 1958: synonym of Volvarina ealesae (Powell, 1958)
- Marginella eburnea Preston, 1906: synonym of Marginella shacklefordi Preston, 1915: synonym of Canalispira shacklefordi (Preston, 1915)
- Marginella eburneola Conrad, 1834: synonym of Dentimargo eburneolus (Conrad, 1834)
- Marginella effulgens Reeve, 1865: synonym of Volvarina effulgens (Reeve, 1865)
- Marginella electrina G. B. Sowerby III, 1892: synonym of Hyalina electrina (G.B. Sowerby III, 1892)
- Marginella electrum Reeve, 1865: synonym of Rivomarginella electrum (Reeve, 1865)
- Marginella elegans (Gmelin, 1791): synonym of Cryptospira elegans (Gmelin, 1791)
- Marginella elliptica Redfield, 1870: synonym of Volvarina elliptica (Redfield, 1870)
- Marginella epigrus Reeve, 1865: synonym of Gibberula epigrus (Reeve, 1865)
- Marginella ergastula Dell, 1953: synonym of Mesoginella ergastula (Dell, 1953)
- Marginella esther Dall, 1927: synonym of Dentimargo esther (Dall, 1927)
- Marginella evanida G. B. Sowerby II, 1846: synonym of Volvarina evanida (G. B. Sowerby II, 1846)
- † Marginella evax Li, 1930 : synonym of Prunum sapotilla (Hinds, 1844)
- Marginella eveleighi Tom & Schackelford, 1913: synonym of Glabella tyermani (Marrat, 1876)
- Marginella evelynae Bayer, 1943: synonym of Prunum evelynae (F. M. Bayer, 1943)
- Marginella everardensis Gabriel, 1961: synonym of Alaginella vercoi (May, 1911)
- Marginella extra (Jousseaume, 1894): synonym of Extra extra Jousseaume, 1894
- Marginella faba (Linnaeus, 1758): synonym of Glabella faba (Linnaeus, 1758)
- Marginella fallax E. A. Smith, 1903: synonym of Canalispira fallax (E. A. Smith, 1903)
- Marginella fauna G. B. Sowerby I, 1846: synonym of Volvarina fauna (G.B. Sowerby I, 1846)
- Marginella fernandinae Dall, 1927: synonym of Eratoidea fernandinae (Dall, 1927)
- Marginella fischeri Bavay, 1903: synonym of Cryptospira fischeri (Bavay, 1903)
- Marginella flammea Link, 1807: synonym of Marginella nebulosa (Röding, 1798)
- Marginella flavida Redfield, 1846: synonym of Prunum apicinum (Menke, 1828)
- Marginella fluctuata C. B. Adams, 1850: synonym of Gibberula fluctuata (C. B. Adams, 1850)
- Marginella formicula Lamarck, 1822: synonym of Austroginella formicula (Lamarck, 1822)
- Marginella fulminata Kiener, 1841: synonym of Prunum fulminatum (Kiener, 1841)
- Marginella fumigata Gofas & Fernandes, 1994: synonym of Glabella fumigata (Gofas & Fernandes, 1994)
- Marginella fuscopicta Turton, 1932: synonym of Marginella piperata fuscopicta Turton, 1932
- Marginella fusiformis Hinds, 1844: synonym of Dentimargo fusiformis (Hinds, 1844)
- Marginella fusina Dall, 1881: synonym of Dentimargo fusinus (Dall, 1881)
- Marginella fusula Murdoch & Suter, 1906: synonym of Dentimargo fusula (Murdoch & Suter, 1906)
- Marginella gambiensis Redfield, 1851: synonym of Prunum amygdalum (Kiener, 1841)
- Marginella gatliffi May, 1911: synonym of Alaginella gatliffi (May, 1911)
- Marginella geminata Hedley, 1912: synonym of Alaginella geminata (Hedley, 1912)
- Marginella gibbosa Jousseaume, 1875: synonym of Prunum terverianum (Petit de la Saussaye, 1851)
- Marginella gigas Martens, 1904: synonym of Marginellona gigas (Martens, 1904)
- Marginella gorii T. Cossignani, 2012: synonym of Marginella gemma A. Adams, 1850
- Marginella goubini Bavay, 1922: synonym of Cystiscus goubini (Bavay, 1922)
- Marginella gracilis May, 1911: synonym of Dentimargo kemblensis (Hedley, 1903)
- Marginella gruveli Bavay in Dautzenberg, 1912: synonym of Gibberula gruveli (Bavay in Dautzenberg, 1912)
- Marginella guancha d'Orbigny, 1840: synonym of Granulina guancha (d'Orbigny, 1840)
- Marginella guillaini Petit de la Saussaye, 1851: synonym of Glabella obtusa (G. B. Sowerby II, 1846)
- Marginella haematita Kiener, 1834: synonym of Eratoidea hematita (Kiener, 1834)
- Marginella hainesi Petit de la Saussaye, 1851: synonym of Cryptospira ventricosa (Fischer von Waldheim, 1807)
- Marginella harpaeformis Sowerby II, 1846: synonym of Glabella harpaeformis (G.B. Sowerby II, 1846)
- Marginella hartleyana Schwengel, 1941: synonym of Prunum hartleyanum (Schwengel, 1941)
- Marginella haswelli Laseron, 1948: synonym of Volvarina haswelli (Laseron, 1948)
- Marginella hebescens Murdoch & Suter, 1906: synonym of Dentimargo hebescens (Murdoch & Suter, 1906)
- Marginella hedleyi May, 1911: synonym of Volvarina hedleyi (May, 1911)
- Marginella hematita Kiener, 1834: synonym of Eratoidea hematita (Kiener, 1834)
- Marginella henrikasi Bozzetti, 1995: synonym of Glabella henrikasi (Bozzetti, 1995)
- Marginella hera W. Turton, 1932: synonym of Plesiocystiscus aphanospira (Tomlin, 1913)
- Marginella herminea Jousseaume, 1875: synonym of Marginella ornata Redfield, 1870
- Marginella hesperia Sykes, 1905: synonym of Dentimargo hesperia (Sykes, 1905)
- Marginella hirasei Bavay, 1917: synonym of Volvarina hirasei (Bavay, 1917)
- Marginella hondurasensis Reeve, 1865: synonym of Prunum pulchrum (Gray, 1839)
- Marginella hyalina Thiele, 1912: synonym of Volvarina hyalina (Thiele, 1912)
- Marginella ignota Jousseaume, 1875: synonym of Dentimargo neglecta (G.B. Sowerby II, 1846)
- Marginella imitator Dall, 1927: synonym of Dentimargo imitator (Dall, 1927)
- Marginella immaculata Dall, 1890: synonym of Dentimargo aureocincta (Stearns, 1872): synonym of Dentimargo aureocinctus (Stearns, 1872)
- Marginella immersa Reeve, 1865: synonym of Cryptospira immersa (Reeve, 1865)
- Marginella imperatrix Sykes, 1905: synonym of Glabella pseudofaba (G.B. Sowerby II, 1846)
- Marginella incessa Dall, 1927: synonym of Dentimargo incessa (Dall, 1927)
- Marginella inconspicua G. B. Sowerby II, 1846: synonym of Mesoginella inconspicua (G. B. Sowerby, 1846)
- Marginella inepta Dall, 1927: synonym of Hyalina discors (Roth, 1974)
- Marginella inflexa Sowerby G.B. I, 1846: synonym of Volvarina mitrella (Risso, 1826)
- Marginella ingloria E. A. Smith, 1910: synonym of Volvarina ingloria (E. A. Smith, 1910)
- Marginella innocens Turton, 1932: synonym of Hyalina perla (Marrat, 1876)
- Marginella intermedia G. B. Sowerby II, 1846: synonym of Marginella floccata G. B. Sowerby III, 1889
- Marginella interrupta Lamarck, 1822: synonym of Persicula interruptolineata (Mühlfeld, 1816)
- Marginella iota Hedley, 1899: synonym of Cystiscus iota (Hedley, 1899)
- Marginella isabelae Borro, 1946: synonym of Volvarina isabelae (Borro, 1946)
- Marginella isseli G. Nevill & H. Nevill, 1875: synonym of Granulina isseli (G. Nevill & H. Nevill, 1875)
- Marginella ithychila Tomlin, 1918: synonym of Gibberula dulcis (E. A. Smith, 1904)
- Marginella jaspidea Schwengel, 1940: synonym of Eratoidea hematita (Kiener, 1834)
- Marginella jewettii Carpenter, 1857: synonym of Plesiocystiscus jewettii (Carpenter, 1857)
- Marginella johnstoni Petterd, 1884: synonym of Austroginella johnstoni (Petterd, 1884)
- Marginella jousseaumei Locard, 1897: synonym of Marginella subturrita P. Fischer, 1884
- Marginella jousseaumi Locard, 1897: synonym of Marginella subturrita P. Fischer, 1884
- Marginella jousseaumi Rochebrune, 1881: synonym of Prunum sauliae (G. B. Sowerby II, 1846): synonym of Volvarina sauliae (G. B. Sowerby II, 1846)
- Marginella judithae Dell, 1956: synonym of Mesoginella judithae (Dell, 1956)
- Marginella keenii Marrat, 1871: synonym of Hyalina keenii (Marrat, 1871)
- Marginella kemblensis Hedley, 1903: synonym of Dentimargo kemblensis (Hedley, 1903)
- Marginella keppeli Sykes, 1905: synonym of Glabella tyermani (Marrat, 1876)
- Marginella kerochuta Shackleford, 1914: synonym of Alaginella kerochuta (Shackleford, 1914)
- Marginella kieneriana Petit de la Saussaye, 1838: synonym of Pachybathron kienerianum (Petit de la Saussaye, 1838)
- Marginella kowiensis Turton, 1932: synonym of Alaginella atracta (Tomlin, 1918)
- Marginella labiata Kiener, 1841: synonym of Prunum labiatum (Kiener, 1841)
- Marginella labrosa Redfield, 1870: synonym of Prunum labrosum (Redfield, 1870)
- Marginella lachrimula Gould, 1862: synonym of Pugnus lachrimula (Gould, 1862)
- Marginella lactea Hutton, 1880: synonym of Austroginella muscaria (Lamarck, 1822)
- Marginella lactea Swainson, 1840: synonym of Prunum marginatum (Born, 1778)
- Marginella lactea Kiener, 1841: synonym of Volvarina abbreviata (C. B. Adams, 1850)
- Marginella laeta Jousseaume, 1875: synonym of Prunum olivaeforme (Kiener, 1834)
- Marginella laetitia Thiele, 1925: synonym of Volvarina laetitia (Thiele, 1925)
- Marginella laevigata Brazier, 1877: synonym of Protoginella lavigata (Brazier, 1877)
- Marginella laevilabris Jousseaume, 1875: synonym of Glabella faba (Linnaeus, 1758)
- Marginella laeviplicata Laseron, 1948: synonym of Alaginella ochracea (Angas, 1871)
- Marginella laevis (Donovan, 1804): synonym of Erato voluta (Montagu, 1803)
- Marginella langleyi G. B. Sowerby, 1892: synonym of Marginella mosaica Sowerby II, 1846
- Marginella lantzi Jousseaume, 1875: synonym of Dentimargo lantzi (Jousseaume, 1875)
- Marginella largillieri Kiener, 1841: synonym of Bullata largillieri (Kiener, 1841)
- Marginella larochei Powell, 1932: synonym of Mesoginella larochei (Powell, 1932)
- Marginella lasallei Talavera & Princz, 1985: synonym of Eratoidea lasallei (Talavera & Princz, 1985)
- Marginella lateritia Melvill & Sykes,1903: synonym of Dentimargo lateritia (Melvill & Sykes, 1903)
- Marginella lavalleeana d'Orbigny, 1842: synonym of Gibberula lavalleeana (d'Orbigny, 1842)
- Marginella lavigata Brazier, 1877: synonym of Protoginella lavigata (Brazier, 1877)
- Marginella leia Cotton, 1944: synonym of Mesoginella turbinata (G. B. Sowerby II, 1846)
- Marginella lepta Bartsch, 1915: synonym of Gibberula burnupi (G.B. Sowerby III, 1897)
- Marginella leptopus Carriere, 1880: synonym of Glabella adansoni (Kiener, 1834)
- Marginella lifouana Crosse, 1871: synonym of Gibberula lifouana (Crosse, 1871)
- Marginella lineata G. B. Sowerby III, 1889: synonym of Marginella piperata Hinds, 1844
- Marginella livida Hinds, 1844: synonym of Prunum apicinum (Menke, 1828)
- Marginella lodderae May, 1911: synonym of Dentimargo lodderae (May, 1911)
- Marginella loebbeckeana Weinkauff, 1878: synonym of Cryptospira praecallosa (Higgins, 1876)
- Marginella longivaricosa Lamarck, 1822: synonym of Prunum guttatum (Dillwyn, 1817)
- Marginella lorenzi Bozzetti, 1995: synonym of Marginella lineatolabrum Gaskoin, 1840
- Marginella loroisii Bernardi, 1857: synonym of Prunum saulcyanum (Petit de la Saussaye, 1851)
- Marginella louisae Bavay, 1913: synonym of Gibberula louisae (Bavay, 1913)
- Marginella lucani Jousseaume, 1884: synonym of Glabella lucani (Jousseaume, 1884)
- Marginella lucida Marrat, 1877: synonym of Hyalina lucida (Marrat, 1877)
- Marginella lurida Suter, 1908: synonym of Dentimargo lurida (Suter, 1908)
- Marginella majuscula Martens, 1877: synonym of Closia majuscula (Martens, 1877)
- Marginella malina Hedley, 1915: synonym of Alaginella malina (Hedley, 1915)
- Marginella manawatawhia Powell, 1937: synonym of Mesoginella manawatawhia (Powell, 1937)
- Marginella manceli (Jousseaume, 1875): synonym of Cystiscus manceli (Jousseaume, 1875)
- Marginella maoria Powell, 1937: synonym of Ovaginella maoria (Powell, 1937)
- Marginella maoriana Powell, 1932: synonym of Serrata maoriana (Powell, 1932)
- Marginella margarita Kiener, 1834: synonym of Eratoidea margarita (Kiener, 1834)
- Marginella margaritula Carpenter, 1857: synonym of Granulina margaritula (Carpenter, 1857)
- Marginella marginata (Born, 1778): synonym of Prunum marginatum (Born, 1778)
- Marginella marianae Bozzetti, 1999: synonym of Prunum pyrumoides Lussi & G. Smith, 1999
- Marginella martini Petit de la Saussaye, 1853: synonym of Prunum martini (Petit de la Saussaye, 1853)
- Marginella matthewsi Van Mol & Tursch, 1967: synonym of Bullata matthewsi ^{(Van Mol & Tursch, 1967)}
- Marginella maugeana Hedley, 1915: synonym of Dentimargo kemblensis (Hedley, 1903)
- Marginella mayii Tate, 1900: synonym of Dentimargo mayii (Tate, 1900)
- Marginella meta Thiele, 1925: synonym of Serrata meta (Thiele, 1925)
- Marginella metcalfei Angas, 1877: synonym of Alaginella ochracea (Angas, 1871)
- Marginella micans Petit de la Saussaye, 1851: synonym of Volvarina micans (Petit de la Saussaye, 1851)
- Marginella microgonia Dall, 1927: synonym of Cystiscus microgonia (Dall, 1927)
- Marginella microscopica May, 1911: synonym of Balanetta cylichnella (May, 1918)
- Marginella miliaria (Linnaeus, 1758): synonym of Gibberula miliaria (Linnaeus, 1758)
- Marginella miliaris (Linnaeus, 1758): synonym of Gibberula miliaria (Linnaeus, 1758)
- Marginella minima Petterd, 1884: synonym of Cystiscus angasi (Crosse, 1870)
- Marginella minor Tate & May, 1901: synonym of Austroginella johnstoni (Petterd, 1884)
- Marginella minuta Philippi, 1844: synonym of Gibberula philippii (Monterosato, 1878)
- Marginella minutissima Tenison-Woods, 1876: synonym of Cystiscus minutissimus (Tenison-Woods, 1876)
- Marginella mirabilis H. Adams, 1869: synonym of Glabella mirabilis (H. Adams, 1869)
- Marginella mixta Petter, 1884: synonym of Hydroginella mixta (Petterd, 1884)
- Marginella monilis (Linnaeus, 1758): synonym of Prunum monile (Linnaeus, 1758)
- Marginella montrouzieri Bavay, 1922: synonym of Cystiscus montrouzieri (Bavay, 1922)
- Marginella moscatelli Boyer, 1997: synonym of Marginella cloveri Rios & Matthews, 1972
- Marginella multizonata Krauss, 1848: synonym of Hyalina cylindrica (G.B. Sowerby II, 1846)
- Marginella muscaria Lamarck, 1822: synonym of Austroginella muscaria (Lamarck, 1822)
- Marginella mustelina Angas, 1871: synonym of Serrata mustelina (Angas, 1871)
- Marginella nana Marrat, 1877: synonym of Gibberula quadrifasciata (Marrat, 1873)
- Marginella narel Jousseaume, 1875: synonym of Glabella adansoni (Kiener, 1834)
- Marginella neglecta G. B. Sowerby II, 1846: synonym of Dentimargo neglecta (G.B. Sowerby II, 1846)
- Marginella neptuni W. Turton, 1932: synonym of Granulina grata (Thiele, 1925)
- Marginella nevilli Jousseaume, 1875: synonym of Volvarina nevilli (Jousseaume, 1875)
- Marginella nielseni Laseron, 1948: synonym of Cystiscus minutissimus (Tenison-Woods, 1876)
- Marginella nigrocrocea Barnard, 1969: synonym of Plesiocystiscus aphanospira (Tomlin, 1913)
- Marginella nimbosus S. G. Veldsman, 2013: synonym of Marginella nimbosa S. G. Veldsman, 2013
- Marginella nitida Hinds, 1844: synonym of Volvarina mitrella (Risso, 1826)
- Marginella nivea C. B. Adams, 1850: synonym of Prunum pruinosum (Hinds, 1844)
- Marginella nivosa Hinds, 1844: synonym of Prunum nivosum (Hinds, 1844)
- Marginella nobiliana Bayer, 1943: synonym of Prunum nobilianum (F. M. Bayer, 1943)
- Marginella nodata Hinds, 1844: synonym of Glabella nodata (Hinds, 1844)
- Marginella noduta [sic]: synonym of Glabella nodata (Hinds, 1844)
- Marginella nubeculata Lamarck, 1822: synonym of Marginella nebulosa (Röding, 1798)
- Marginella nubicola Swainson, 1840: synonym of Marginella nebulosa (Röding, 1798)
- Marginella oblonga Swainson, 1829: synonym of Prunum oblongum (Swainson, 1829)
- Marginella obscura Reeve, 1865: synonym of Volvarina obscura (Reeve, 1865)
- Marginella obtusa G. B. Sowerby II, 1870: synonym of Cryptospira grisea (Jousseaume, 1917)
- Marginella obtusa G.B. Sowerby II, 1846: synonym of Glabella obtusa (G. B. Sowerby II, 1846)
- Marginella occidua Cotton, 1944: synonym of Volvarina occidua (Cotton, 1944)
- Marginella occulta Monterosato, 1869: synonym of Granulina occulta (Monterosato, 1869)
- Marginella ochracea Angas, 1871: synonym of Alaginella ochracea (Angas, 1871)
- Marginella olivaeformis Kiener, 1834: synonym of Prunum olivaeforme (Kiener, 1834)
- Marginella olivella Reeve, 1865: synonym of Mesoginella olivella (Reeve, 1865)
- Marginella onychina A. Adams & Reeve, 1850: synonym of Cryptospira onychina (A. Adams & Reeve, 1850)
- Marginella opalina Stearns, 1872: synonym of Dentimargo eburneolus (Conrad, 1834)
- Marginella otagoensis Dell, 1956: synonym of Mesoginella otagoensis (Dell, 1956)
- Marginella ovalis Marrat, 1881: synonym of Cryptospira tricincta (Hinds, 1844)
- Marginella ovulum G. B. Sowerby II, 1846: synonym of Ovaginella ovulum (G. B. Sowerby II, 1846)
- Marginella ovum Reeve, 1865: synonym of Bullata largillieri (Kiener, 1841)
- Marginella pachia Watson, 1886: synonym of Triginella pachia (Watson, 1886)
- Marginella pallata Bavay in Dautzenberg, 1912: synonym of Gibberula pallata (Bavay in Dautzenberg, 1912)
- Marginella pallida (Linnaeus, 1767): synonym of Hyalina pallida (Linnaeus, 1758)
- Marginella paros Jousseaume, 1875: synonym of Bullata largillieri (Kiener, 1841)
- Marginella parsobrina Laseron, 1948: synonym of Mesoginella sinapi (Laseron, 1948)
- Marginella parvula Locard, 1897: synonym of Volvarina attenuata (Reeve, 1865)
- Marginella pattisoni Cotton, 1944: synonym of Mesoginella turbinata (G. B. Sowerby II, 1846)
- Marginella paumotensis Pease, 1868: synonym of Volvarina paumotensis (Pease, 1868)
- Marginella paxillas Paetel, 1883: synonym of Volvarina attenuata (Reeve, 1865)
- Marginella paxillus Reeve, 1865: synonym of Volvarina attenuata (Reeve, 1865)
- Marginella pellicula Weinkauff, 1879: synonym of Hyalina lucida (Marrat, 1877)
- Marginella pellucida Pfeiffer, 1840: synonym of Prunum pellucidum (Pfeiffer, 1840)
- Marginella pellucida Weinkauff, 1879: synonym of Volvarina fauna (G.B. Sowerby I, 1846)
- Marginella perexilis Bavay, 1922: synonym of Dentimargo perexilis (Bavay, 1922)
- Marginella pericalles Tomlin, 1916: synonym of Volvarina pericalles (Tomlin, 1916)
- Marginella perla Marrat, 1876: synonym of Hyalina perla (Marrat, 1876)
- Marginella perminima G. B. Sowerby III, 1894: synonym of Granulina perminima (G. B. Sowerby III, 1894)
- Marginella perrieri Bavay, 1906: synonym of Volvarina perrieri (Bavay, 1906)
- Marginella persicula Linnaeus, 1758: synonym of Persicula persicula (Linnaeus, 1758)
- Marginella persiculocingulata Tournier, 1997 : synonym of Persicula persiculocingulata (Tournier, 1997)
- Marginella petterdi Beddome, 1883 : synonym of Ovaginella ovulum (G. B. Sowerby II, 1846)
- Marginella philippii Monterosato, 1878 : synonym of Gibberula philippii (Monterosato, 1878)
- Marginella philippinarium Redfield, 1848: synonym of Volvarina philippinarum (Redfield, 1848)
- Marginella philtata Abbott, 1954 : synonym of Eratoidea hematita (Kiener, 1834)
- Marginella picta Dillwyn, 1817 : synonym of Marginella nebulosa (Röding, 1798)
- Marginella pisum Reeve, 1865: synonym of Balanetta pisum (Reeve, 1865)
- Marginella platypus Carriere, 1880 : synonym of Marginella glabella (Linnaeus, 1758)
- Marginella ponsonbyi G. B. Sowerby III, 1897 : synonym of Hyalina cylindrica (G.B. Sowerby II, 1846)
- Marginella poucheti Petit de la Saussaye, 1851 : synonym of Marginella glabella (Linnaeus, 1758)
- Marginella praecallosa Higgins, 1876 : synonym of Cryptospira praecallosa (Higgins, 1876)
- Marginella praiameliensis Fernandes & Alves, 1991 : synonym of Marginella carquejai Gofas & Fernandes, 1994
- Marginella princeps G. B. Sowerby III, 1901 : synonym of Closia princeps (G. B. Sowerby III, 1901)
- Marginella profunda Suter, 1909 : synonym of Ovaginella profunda (Suter, 1909)
- Marginella pruinosa Hinds, 1844 : synonym of Prunum pruinosum (Hinds, 1844)
- Marginella pseudofaba Sowerby II, 1846 : synonym of Glabella pseudofaba (G.B. Sowerby II, 1846)
- Marginella pseustes E. A. Smith, 1904 : synonym of Granulina pseustes (E. A. Smith, 1904) : synonym of Cystiscus pseustes (E. A. Smith, 1904)
- Marginella pulchella Kiener, 1834: synonym of Persicula pulchella (Kiener, 1834)
- Marginella pulchra Gray, 1839 : synonym of Prunum pulchrum (Gray, 1839)
- Marginella pumila Redfield, 1870: synonym of Dentimargo pumila Redfield, 1869
- Marginella punicea Laseron, 1948 : synonym of Gibberula agapeta (Watson, 1886)
- Marginella pupa Bavay, 1922 : synonym of Volvarina pupa (Bavay, 1922)
- Marginella pura E. A. Smith, 1904 : synonym of Alaginella zeyheri (Krauss, 1852)
- Marginella pygmaea G. B. Sowerby, 1846: synonym of Mesoginella pygmaea (G. B. Sowerby, 1846)
- Marginella pygmaea Issel, 1869 : synonym of Marginella isseli G. Nevill & H. Nevill, 1875 : synonym of Granulina isseli (G. Nevill & H. Nevill, 1875)
- Marginella pygmaeiformis Powell, 1937 : synonym of Mesoginella pygmaeiformis (Powell, 1937)
- Marginella pygmaeoides Singleton, 1937: synonym of Mesoginella pygmaeoides (Singleton, 1937)
- Marginella pygmora (Laseron, 1957) : synonym of Alaginella pygmora Laseron, 1957
- Marginella quadrifasciata Marrat, 1873 : synonym of Gibberula quadrifasciata (Marrat, 1873)
- Marginella quadrilineata Gaskoin, 1849 : synonym of Cryptospira quadrilineata (Gaskoin, 1849)
- Marginella quadrilineata Reeve, 1864 : synonym of Cryptospira quadrilineata (Gaskoin, 1849)
- Marginella quinqueplicata Lamarck, 1822 : synonym of Cryptospira ventricosa (Fischer von Waldheim, 1807)
- Marginella quinqueplicata Laseron, 1948 : synonym of Gibberula agapeta (Watson, 1886)
- Marginella radiata Lamarck, 1822 : synonym of Amoria zebra (Leach, 1814)
- Marginella redfieldii Tryon, 1883: synonym of Prunum redfieldii (Tryon, 1883)
- Marginella reducta Bavay, 1922 : synonym of Dentimargo reductus (Bavay, 1922)
- Marginella reeveana (Petit, 1851): synonym of Glabella reeveana (Petit de la Saussaye, 1851)
- Marginella reevei Krauss, 1852 : synonym of Dentimargo neglecta (G.B. Sowerby II, 1846)
- † Marginella regula Cotton, 1949: synonym of † Mioginella regula (Cotton, 1949)
- Marginella repentina Sykes, 1905 : synonym of Dentimargo repentina (Sykes, 1905)
- Marginella replicata Melvill, 1912 : synonym of Canalispira replicata (Melvill, 1912)
- Marginella rietensis Turton, 1932 : synonym of Hyalina lucida (Marrat, 1877)
- Marginella ringicula G. B. Sowerby III, 1901: synonym of Dentimargo ringicula (G. B. Sowerby III, 1901)
- Marginella roberti Bavay, 1917 : synonym of Volvarina roberti Bavay, 1917
- Marginella robusta G. B. Sowerby III, 1904 : synonym of Persicula robusta (G. B. Sowerby III, 1904)
- Marginella roosevelti Bartsch & Rehder, 1939 : synonym of Prunum amabile (Redfield, 1852)
- Marginella roscida Redfield, 1860 : synonym of Prunum roscidum (Redfield, 1860)
- Marginella rostrata Redfield, 1870 : synonym of Prunum rostratum (Redfield, 1870)
- Marginella rotunda Laseron, 1948: synonym of Ovaginella tenisoni (Pritchard, 1900)
- Marginella rubella C. B. Adams, 1845 : synonym of Volvarina rubella (C. B. Adams, 1845)
- Marginella rubens Martens, 1881 : synonym of Prunum rubens (Martens, 1881)
- Marginella rufanensis W. H. Turton, 1932: synonym of Gibberula rufanensis (W. H. Turton, 1932)
- Marginella ruffina Swainson, 1840 : synonym of Marginella glabella (Linnaeus, 1758)
- Marginella rufula Gaskoin, 1853 : synonym of Dentimargo neglecta (G.B. Sowerby II, 1846)
- Marginella sandwicensis Pease, 1860: synonym of Gibberula sandwicensis (Pease, 1860)
- Marginella sapotilla Hinds, 1844: synonym of Prunum sapotilla (Hinds, 1844)
- Marginella sarda Kiener, 1834: synonym of Closia sarda (Kiener, 1834)
- Marginella saulcyana Petit de la Saussaye, 1851: synonym of Prunum saulcyanum (Petit de la Saussaye, 1851)
- Marginella sauliae G. B. Sowerby II, 1846: synonym of Volvarina sauliae (G. B. Sowerby II, 1846)
- Marginella savignyi: synonym of Gibberula savignyi
- Marginella scalaris Jousseaume, 1875: synonym of Eratoidea scalaris (Jousseaume, 1875)
- Marginella schoutanica May, 1913: synonym of Mesoginella schoutanica (May, 1913)
- Marginella scitula Turton, 1932: synonym of Marginella piperata Hinds, 1844
- Marginella scripta Hinds, 1844: synonym of Cryptospira scripta (Hinds, 1844)
- Marginella secalina Philippi, 1844: synonym of Volvarina mitrella (Risso, 1826)
- Marginella seminula Dall, 1881: synonym of Prunum abyssorum (Tomlin, 1916)
- Marginella serpentina Jousseaume, 1875: synonym of Marginella lussii Hayes & Millard, 1995
- Marginella serrata Gaskoin, 1849: synonym of Serrata serrata (Gaskoin, 1849)
- Marginella sexplicata Weinkauff, 1879: synonym of Cryptospira grisea (Jousseaume, 1917)
- Marginella shacklefordi Preston, 1915: synonym of Canalispira shacklefordi (Preston, 1915)
- Marginella shepstonensis E. A. Smith, 1906: synonym of Persicula shepstonensis (E. A. Smith, 1906)
- Marginella shorehami Pritchard & Gatliff, 1899: synonym of Cystiscus angasi (Crosse, 1870)
- Marginella simsoni Tate & May, 1900: synonym of Cystiscus angasi (Crosse, 1870)
- Marginella sinapi Laseron, 1948: synonym of Mesoginella sinapi (Laseron, 1948)
- Marginella sordida Reeve, 1865: synonym of Hydroginella sordida (Reeve, 1865)
- Marginella sowerbyana Petit de la Saussaye, 1851: synonym of Prunum monile (Linnaeus, 1758)
- Marginella splendens Reeve, 1842: synonym of Glabella reeveana (Petit de la Saussaye, 1851)
- Marginella spryi Clover, 1974: synonym of Serrata spryi (Clover, 1974)
- Marginella stewartiana Suter, 1908: synonym of Dentimargo stewartiana (Suter, 1908)
- Marginella stilla Hedley, 1903: synonym of Mesoginella stilla (Hedley, 1903)
- Marginella storeria Couthouy, 1837: synonym of Prunum storeria (Couthouy, 1837)
- Marginella strangei Angas, 1877: synonym of Mesoginella strangei (Angas, 1877)
- Marginella striata G. B. Sowerby II, 1846: synonym of Eratoidea sulcata (d'Orbigny, 1842)
- Marginella strigata G. B. Sowerby III, 1889: synonym of Marginella piperata Hinds, 1844
- † Marginella strombiformis Tenison Woods, 1877: synonym of † Serrata strombiformis (Tenison Woods, 1877)
- Marginella suavis Souverbie, 1859: synonym of Dentimargo suavis (Souverbie, 1859)
- Marginella subamoena Powell, 1937: synonym of Dentimargo subamoena (Powell, 1937)
- Marginella subfusula Powell, 1932: synonym of Dentimargo subfusula (Powell, 1932)
- Marginella succinea Conrad, 1846: synonym of Prunum succineum (Conrad, 1846)
- Marginella sueziensis: synonym of Gibberula sueziensis (Issel, 1869)
- Marginella sulcata d'Orbigny, 1842: synonym of Eratoidea sulcata (d'Orbigny, 1842)
- Marginella taeniata G. B. Sowerby II, 1846: synonym of Volvarina taeniata (G. B. Sowerby II, 1846)
- † Marginella talla Cotton, 1949: synonym of † Mesoginella talla (Cotton, 1949) * Marginella tasmanica Tenison-Woods, 1875: synonym of Austroginella tasmanica (Tenison-Woods, 1876)
- Marginella taylori Shackleford, 1916: synonym of Gibberula differens (E. A. Smith, 1904)
- Marginella tenisoni Pritchard, 1900: synonym of Ovaginella tenisoni (Pritchard, 1900)
- Marginella terveriana Petit de la Saussaye, 1851: synonym of Prunum terverianum (Petit de la Saussaye, 1851)
- Marginella thalia W. H. Turton, 1932: synonym of Plesiocystiscus thalia (W. H. Turton, 1932)
- Marginella thetis Turton, 1932: synonym of Marginella piperata Hinds, 1844
- Marginella thomensis Tomlin, 1919: synonym of Gibberula thomensis (Tomlin, 1919)
- Marginella tomlini Shackleford, 1916: synonym of Marginella bicatenata G. B. Sowerby III, 1914
- Marginella torticula Dall, 1881: synonym of Prunum torticulum (Dall, 1881)
- Marginella trailli Reeve, 1865: synonym of Cryptospira trailli (Reeve, 1865)
- Marginella translucida G. B. Sowerby II, 1846: synonym of Austroginella translucida (G. B. Sowerby II, 1846)
- Marginella tricincta Hinds, 1844: synonym of Cryptospira tricincta (Hinds, 1844)
- Marginella tridentata Tate, 1878: synonym of Hydroginella tridentata (Tate, 1878)
- Marginella triticea Lamarck, 1822: synonym of Volvarina exilis (Gmelin, 1791)
- Marginella tryphenensis Powell, 1932: synonym of Mesoginella tryphenensis (Powell, 1932)
- Marginella turbinata G. B. Sowerby II, 1846: synonym of Mesoginella turbinata (G. B. Sowerby II, 1846)
- Marginella turbiniformis Bavay, 1917: synonym of Protoginella turbiniformis (Bavay, 1917)
- Marginella turgidula Locard & Caziot, 1900: synonym of Gibberula turgidula (Locard & Caziot, 1900)
- Marginella turtoni Bartsch, 1915: synonym of Hyalina lucida (Marrat, 1877)
- Marginella tyermani Marrat, 1876: synonym of Glabella tyermani (Marrat, 1876)
- Marginella undulata Deshayes, 1844: synonym of Cryptospira strigata (Dillwyn, 1817)
- Marginella unifasciata Turton, 1932: synonym of Marginella munda E. A. Smith, 1904
- Marginella unilineata Jousseaume, 1875: synonym of Volvarina unilineata (Jousseaume, 1875)
- Marginella vailei Powell, 1932: synonym of Mesoginella vailei (Powell, 1932)
- Marginella valida Watson, 1886: synonym of Alaginella valida (Watson, 1886)
- Marginella veliei Pilsbry, 1896: synonym of Prunum succineum (Conrad, 1846)
- Marginella ventricosa Fischer von Waldheim, 1807: synonym of Cryptospira ventricosa (Fischer von Waldheim, 1807)
- Marginella ventricosa Hedley, 1903: synonym of Cryptospira ventricosa (Fischer von Waldheim, 1807)
- Marginella vercoi May, 1911: synonym of Alaginella vercoi (May, 1911)
- Marginella vermiculata Redfield, 1851: synonym of Cryptospira ventricosa (Fischer von Waldheim, 1807)
- Marginella victoriae Gatliff & Gabriel, 1908: synonym of Mesoginella victoriae (Gatliff & Gabriel, 1908)
- Marginella vignali Dautzenberg & Fischer, 1896: synonym of Gibberula vignali (Dautzenberg & H. Fischer, 1896)
- Marginella vimonti Jousseaume, 1875: synonym of Glabella denticulata (Link, 1807)
- Marginella vincentiana Cotton, 1944: synonym of Hydroginella vincentiana (Cotton, 1944)
- Marginella virginea Jousseaume, 1875: synonym of Prunum apicinum (Menke, 1828)
- Marginella virginiana Verrill, 1885: synonym of Dentimargo smithii (A. E. Verrill, 1885)
- † Marginella virginiana (Conrad, 1868): synonym of † Prunum virginianum Conrad, 1868
- Marginella vittata Reeve, 1866: synonym of Marginella ornata Redfield, 1870
- Marginella vittata Hutton, 1873: synonym of Persicula cingulata (Dillwyn, 1817)
- Marginella volutiformis Reeve, 1865: synonym of Austroginella translucida (G. B. Sowerby II, 1846)
- Marginella walkeri E. A. Smith, 1899: synonym of Dentimargo walkeri (E. A. Smith, 1899)
- Marginella walvisiana Tomlin, 1920: synonym of Prunum walvisianum (Tomlin, 1920)
- Marginella warrenii Marrat, 1876: synonym of Volvarina warrenii (Marrat, 1876)
- Marginella watsoni Dall, 1881: synonym of Eratoidea watsoni (Dall, 1881)
- Marginella weedingi Cotton, 1944: synonym of Alaginella geminata (Hedley, 1912)
- Marginella whitechurchi W. Turton, 1932: synonym of Granulina grata (Thiele, 1925)
- Marginella woodbridgei Hertlein & Strong, 1951: synonym of Prunum woodbridgei (Hertlein & Strong, 1951)
- Marginella xanthostoma Mörch, 1852: synonym of Prunum pulchrum (Gray, 1839)
- Marginella xicoi Boyer, Ryall & Wakefield, 1999: synonym of Glabella xicoi (Boyer, Ryall & Wakefield, 1999)
- Marginella youngi Kilburn, 1977: synonym of Glabella youngi (Kilburn, 1977)
- Marginella yucatecana Dall, 1881: synonym of Dentimargo yucatecanus (Dall, 1881)
- Marginella zeyheri Krauss, 1852: synonym of Alaginella zeyheri (Krauss, 1852)
- Marginella zonata Kiener, 1841: synonym of Volvarina bilineata (Krauss, 1848)

=== Western Atlantic species ===
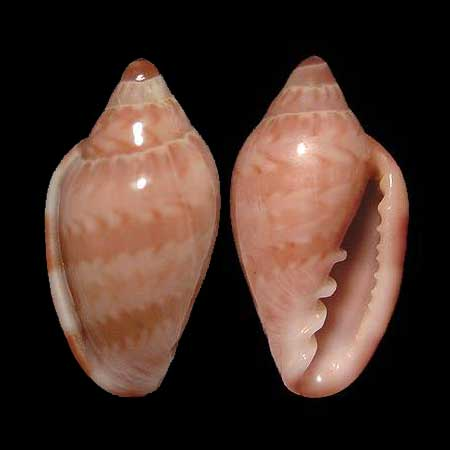
Marginella cloveri
Barra, Brazil

=== Western Africa species ===
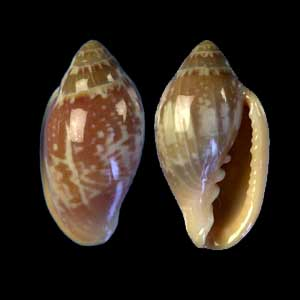
Marginella aurantia
N´Gor, Senegal

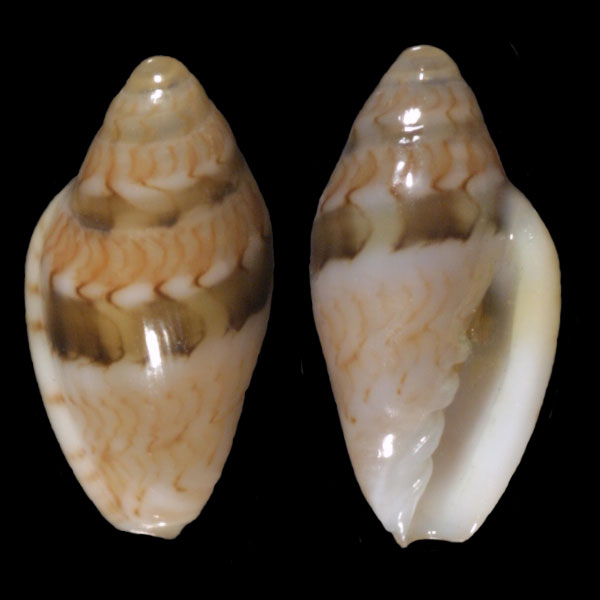
Marginella bavayi
Senegal (Gorée Is.)

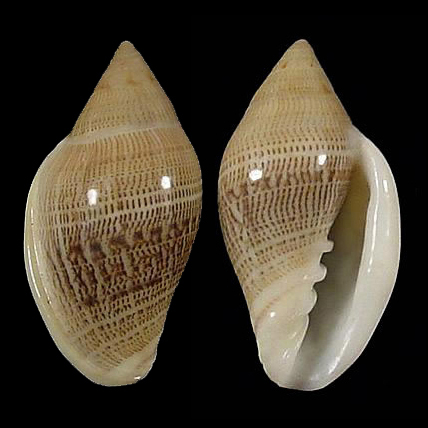
Marginella belcheri
South Western Sahara, Mauritania

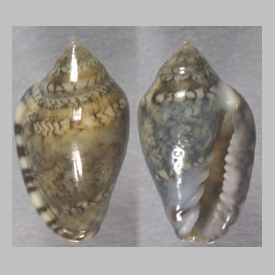
Marginella carquejai
Praia Amélia, Namibe
Angola

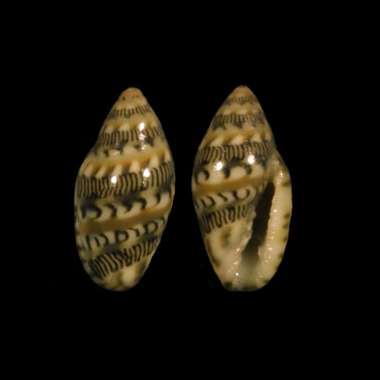
Marginella chalmersi
St. Tomé Is.

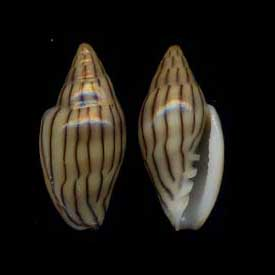
Marginella cleryi
southern Mauritania

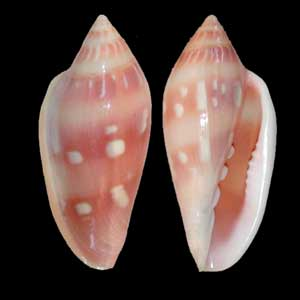
Marginella desjardini
offshore Dakar, Senegal

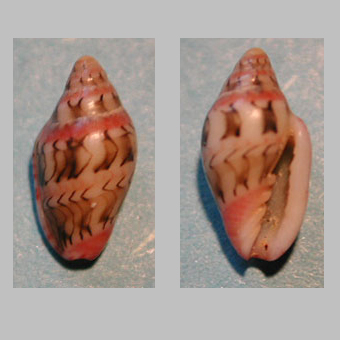
Marginella festiva
Almadies, Dakar, Senegal

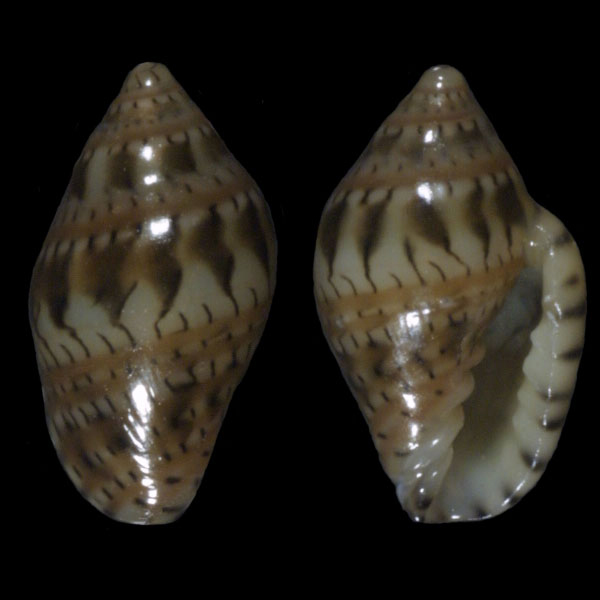
Marginella gemmula
Saco Mar, Namibe, Angola

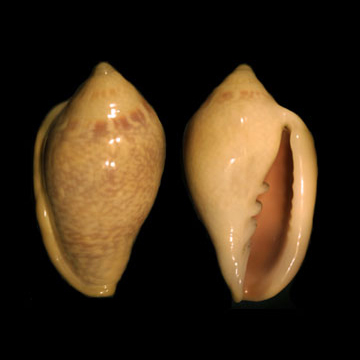
Marginella glabella
offshore Dakar, Senegal

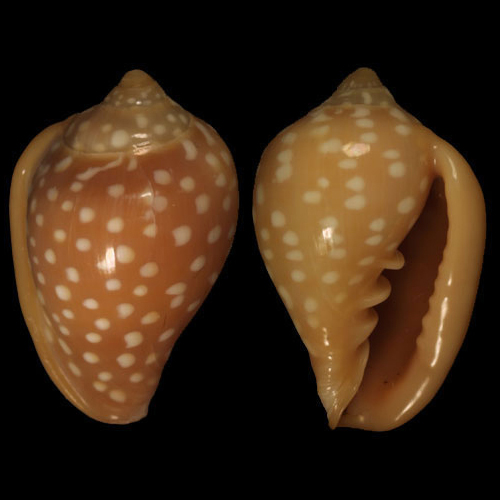
Marginella goodalli
Dakar Harbour, Senegal

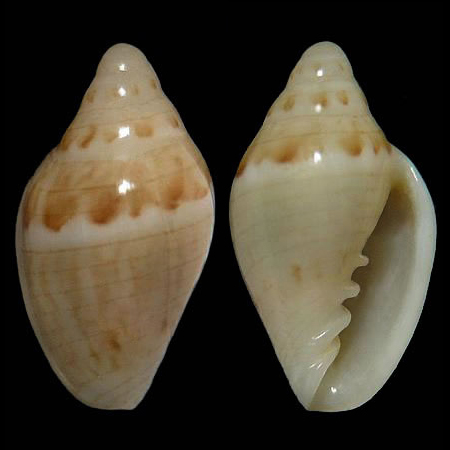
Marginella gloriosa
Western Sahara

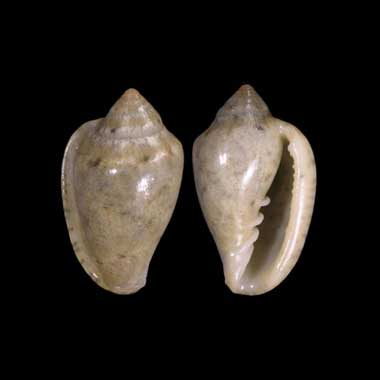
Marginella huberti
off Luanda, Angola

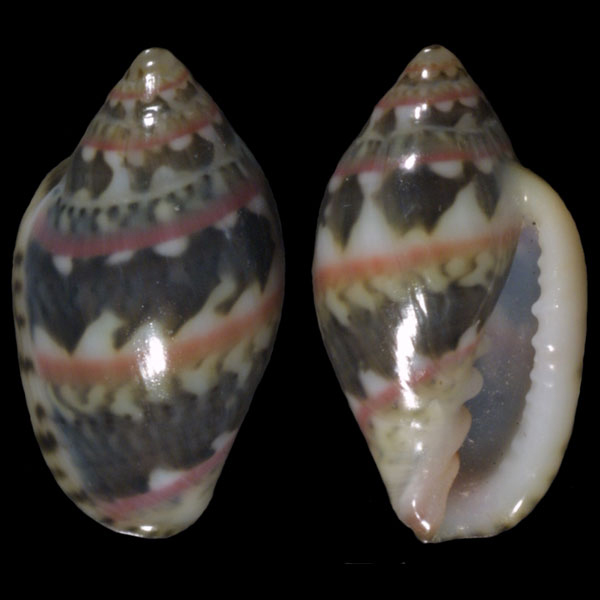
Marginella liparozona
Annobón, Gulf of Guinea

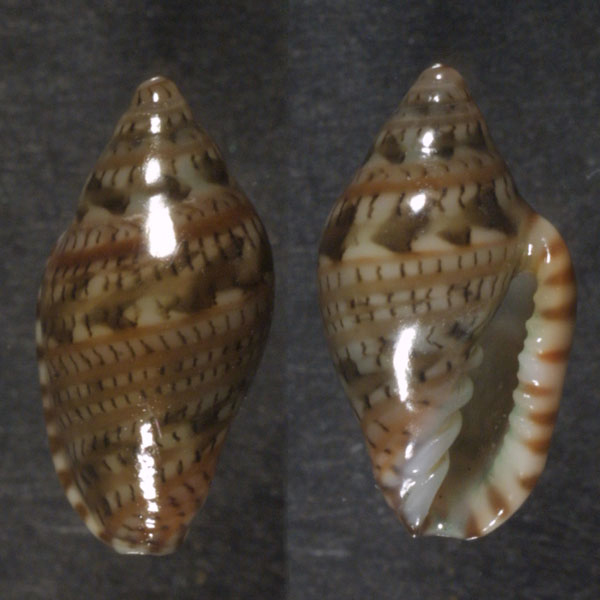
Marginella luculenta
Saco Mar, Namibe, Angola

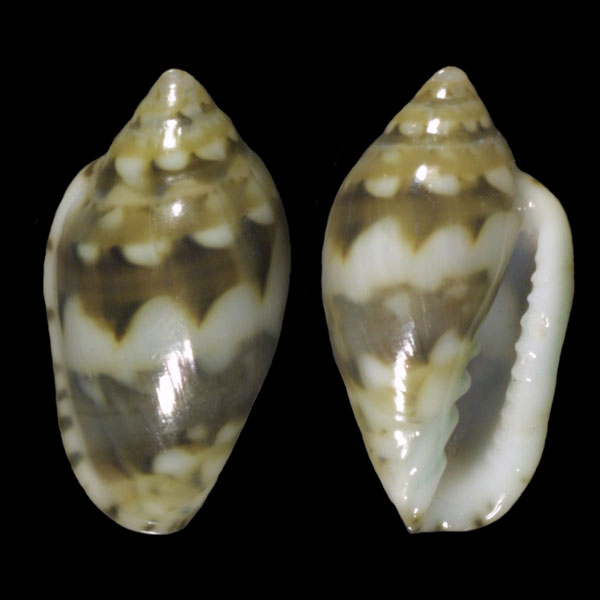
Marginella melvilli
Baía St. Antonio
Principe Is

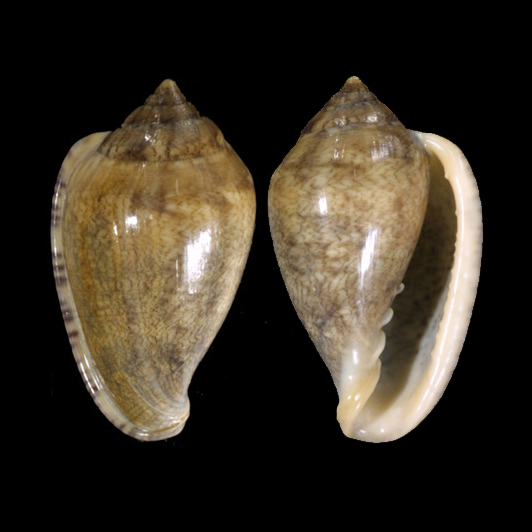
Marginella orstomi
off Luanda, Angola

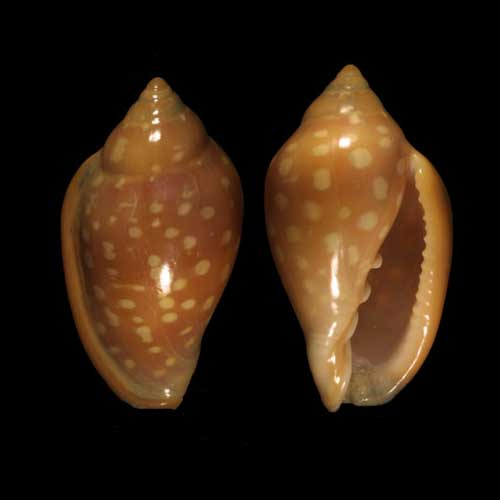
Marginella sebastiani
off Guiné-Bissau

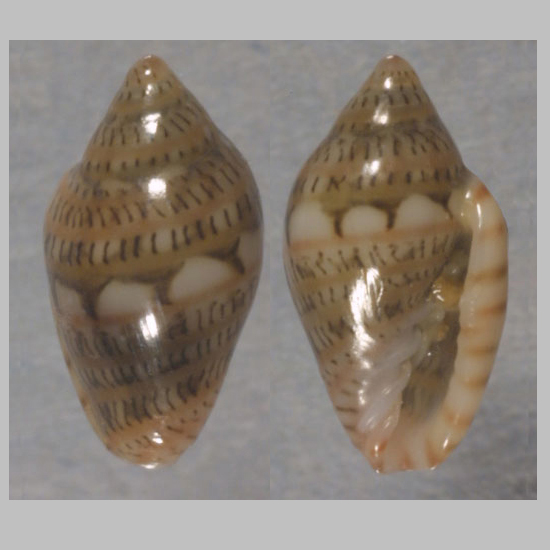
Marginella simulata
Praia Amélia, Namibe
Angola

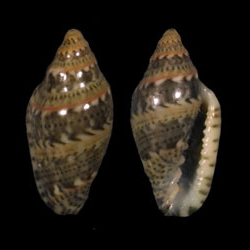
Marginella spinacia
Espraínha, S. Tomé Is.

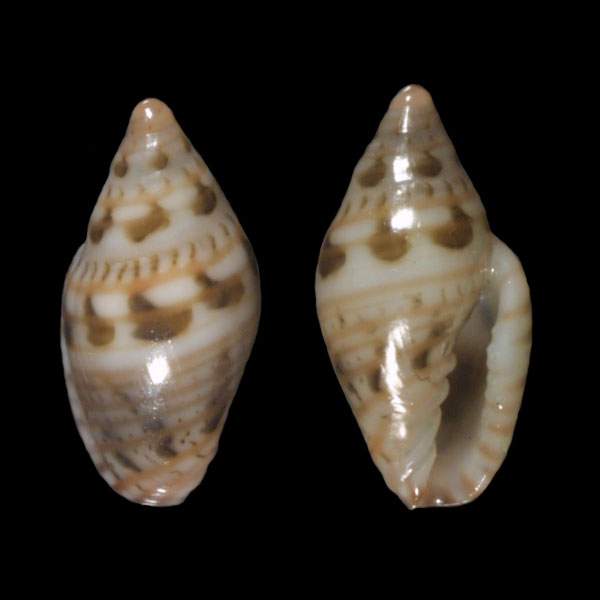
Marginella undulans
Saco Mar, Namibe, Angola

=== Southern Africa species ===
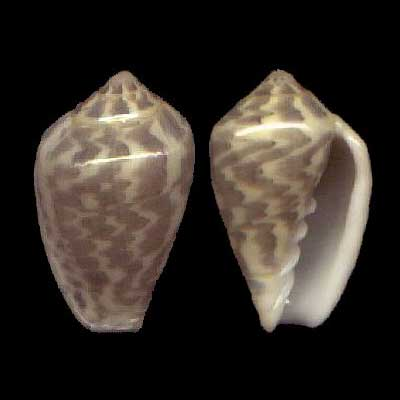
Marginella bairstowi
Fishhoeck, False Bay
South Africa

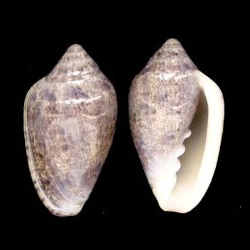
Marginella broderickae
South East Cape
South Africa

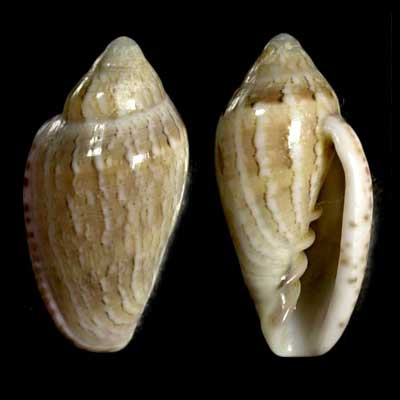
Marginella cosmia
East London, South Africa

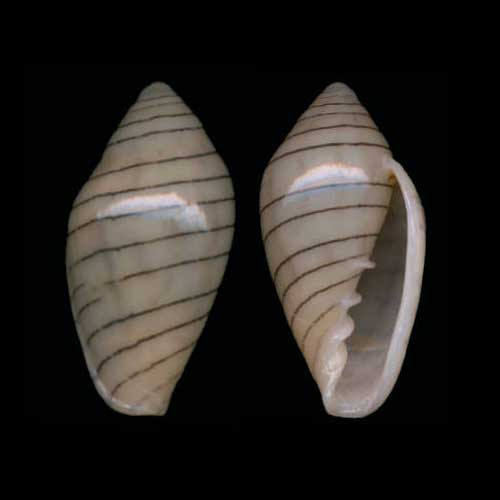
Marginella diadochus
Luderitz, Namibia

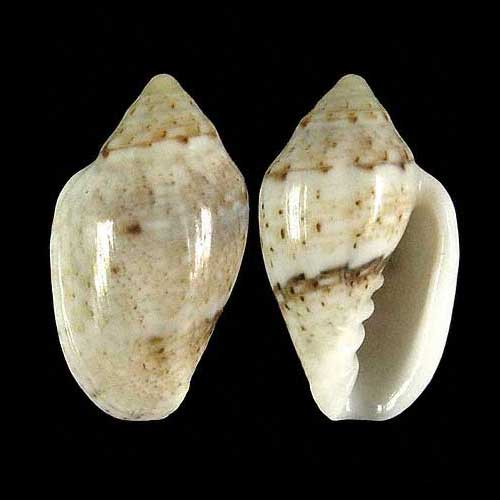
Marginella eucosmia
NE Port Elizabeth
South Africa

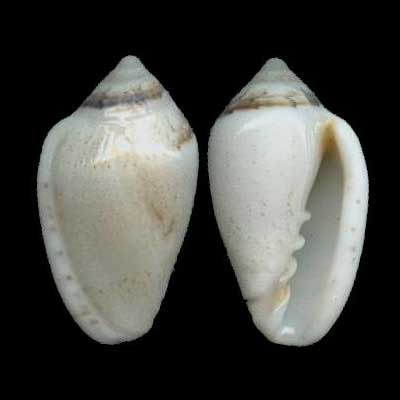
Marginella minuscula
Algoa Bay, South Africa

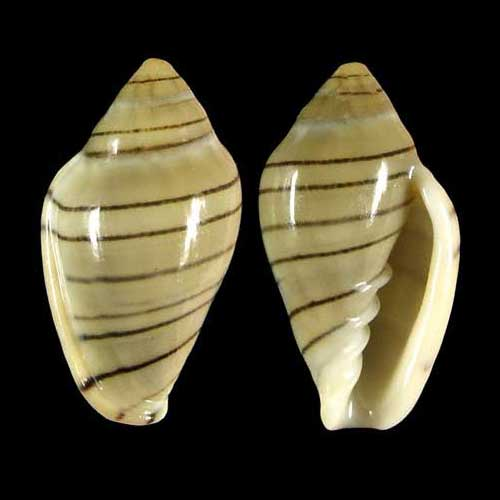
Marginella musica
Cape Agulhas
South Africa

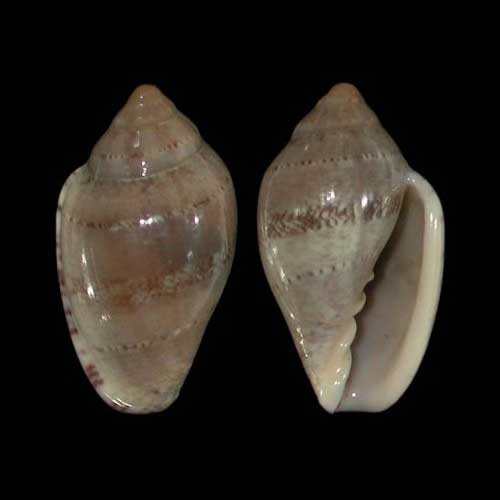
Marginella ornata
Transkei, South Africa

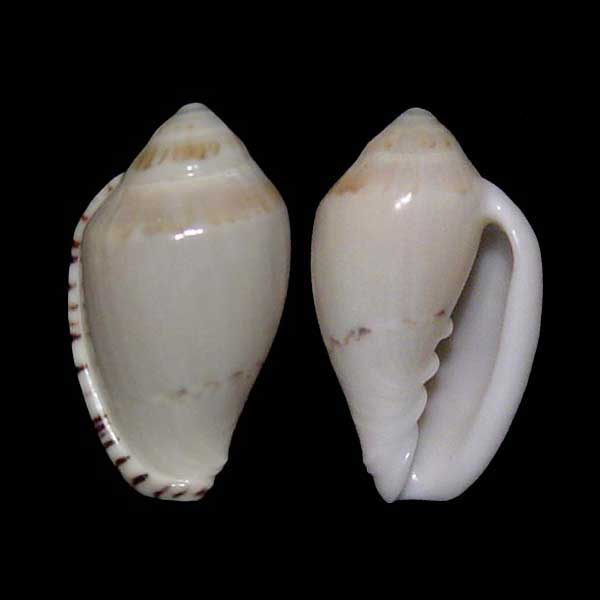
Marginella peelae
f. beltmani
False Bay, S. Africa

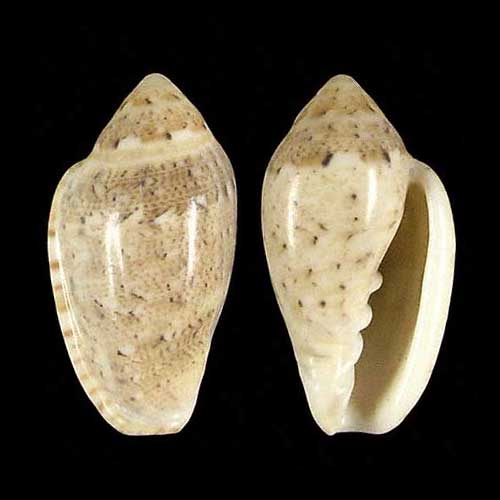
Marginella piperata
Jeffreys Bay, South Africa

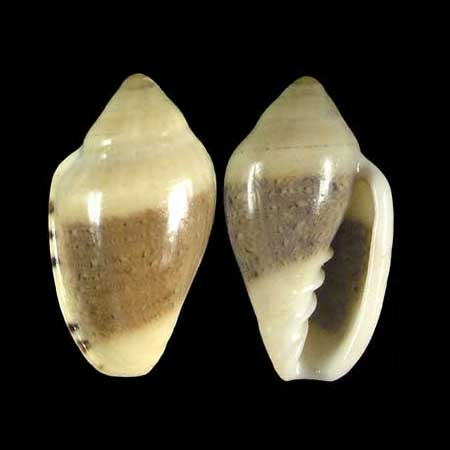
Marginella piperata albocincta
Algoa Bay, South Africa

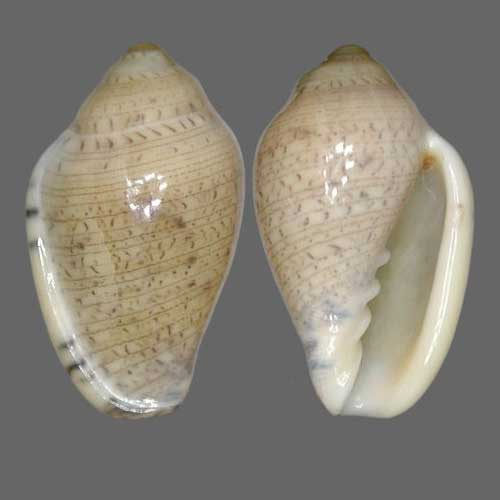
Marginella piperata lutea
Algoa Bay, South Africa

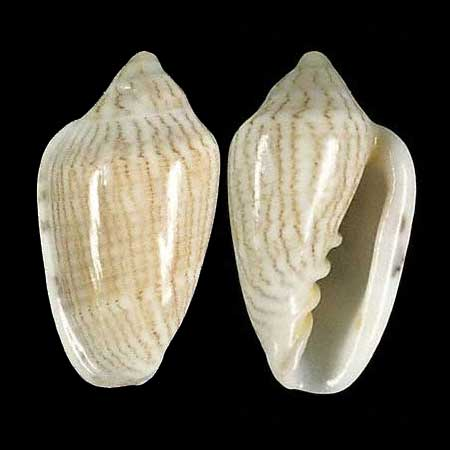
Marginella piperata strigata
East London, South Africa

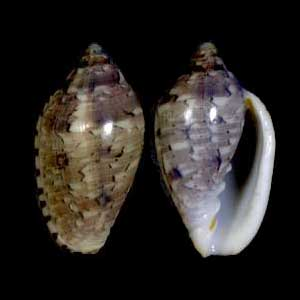
Marginella rosea
Gansbaai, S. Africa

=== Eastern Africa species ===
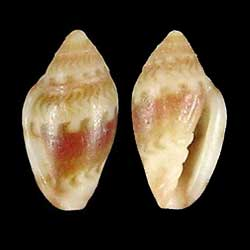
Marginella anna
Bazaruto Is., Mozambique

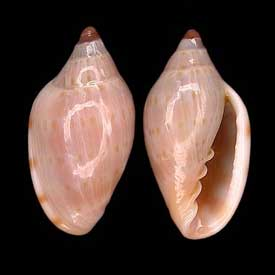
Marginella caterinae
off Hafun-Bay-north
Somalia
