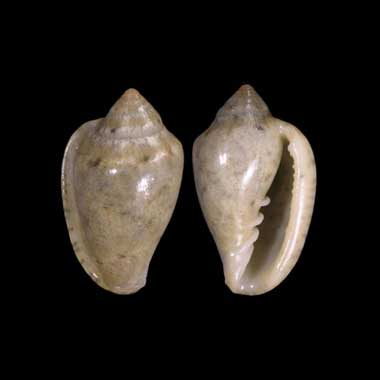

Scientific classification
- Kingdom: Animalia
- Phylum: Mollusca
- Class: Gastropoda
- Subclass: Caenogastropoda
- Order: Neogastropoda
- Family: Marginellidae
- Genus: Marginella
- Species: M. huberti

Binomial name
- Marginella huberti Clover, 1972

= Marginella huberti =

Species of gastropod

Marginella huberti is a species of colorful small sea snail, a marine gastropod mollusc in the family Marginellidae.

== Distribution ==
This species occurs in Angola, south central Africa.

== Shell description ==
The shell is 17 to 27 mm in length, 10 to 16 mm in greatest diameter, with a low conical spire and an indistinct suture. The outer lip is thickened, and strongly reflected outward, with a sharp edge overhanging the exterior of the body whorl.

The inside of the lip of the shell has 15-25 small irregular denticles, plus one very strong isolated denticle near its posterior end. The aperture is quite high for the genus, and it narrows both anteriorly and posteriorly.

The first two apical whorls are pale brown. The remainder of the shell is beige with tiny ash-grey dots arranged in spiral rows and looser wavy axial lines. There are small dark blotches serially arranged along the suture, and a larger series of crescentic blotches just above the shoulder of the body whorl. The areas between the shoulder and the suture, and along a band on the anterior part of the body whorl, are darker with blurred blotches; some darker blotches or flames are also sometimes visible on the middle part of the body whorl. The outer lip has 15 to 25 dark grey streaks, often clustered in groups of 2 or 3, and mostly visible on the outermost, reflected part of the lip.

== Type material ==
Holotype No.EE 3659	18.8mm x 10.6mm	Manchester Museum
Paratype 1	...	P. Clover collection
Paratype 2 No. 19728	...	BMNH

== Type locality ==
Baía dos Elefantes, Benguela, in 15 fathoms (27m).

== Habitat ==
In shell gravel or mixed sediments around rocky areas, at 10 to 100m.

== Color and patterns ==
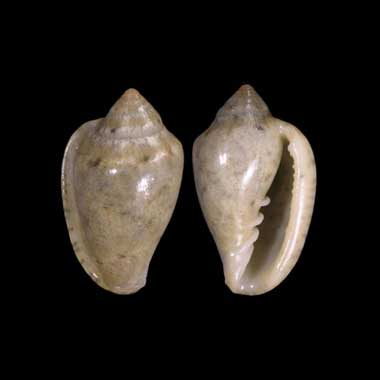
Angola 14,7mm

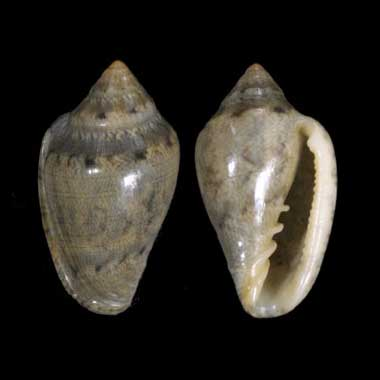
Angola 16,4mm

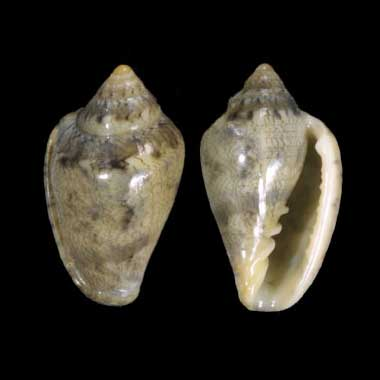
Angola 15,6mm

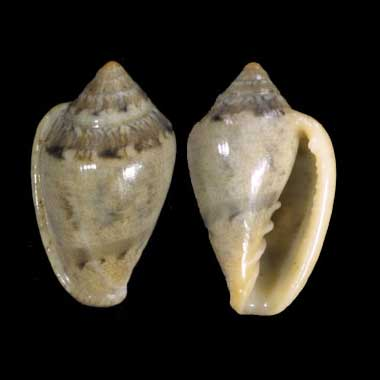
Angola 15,9mm
