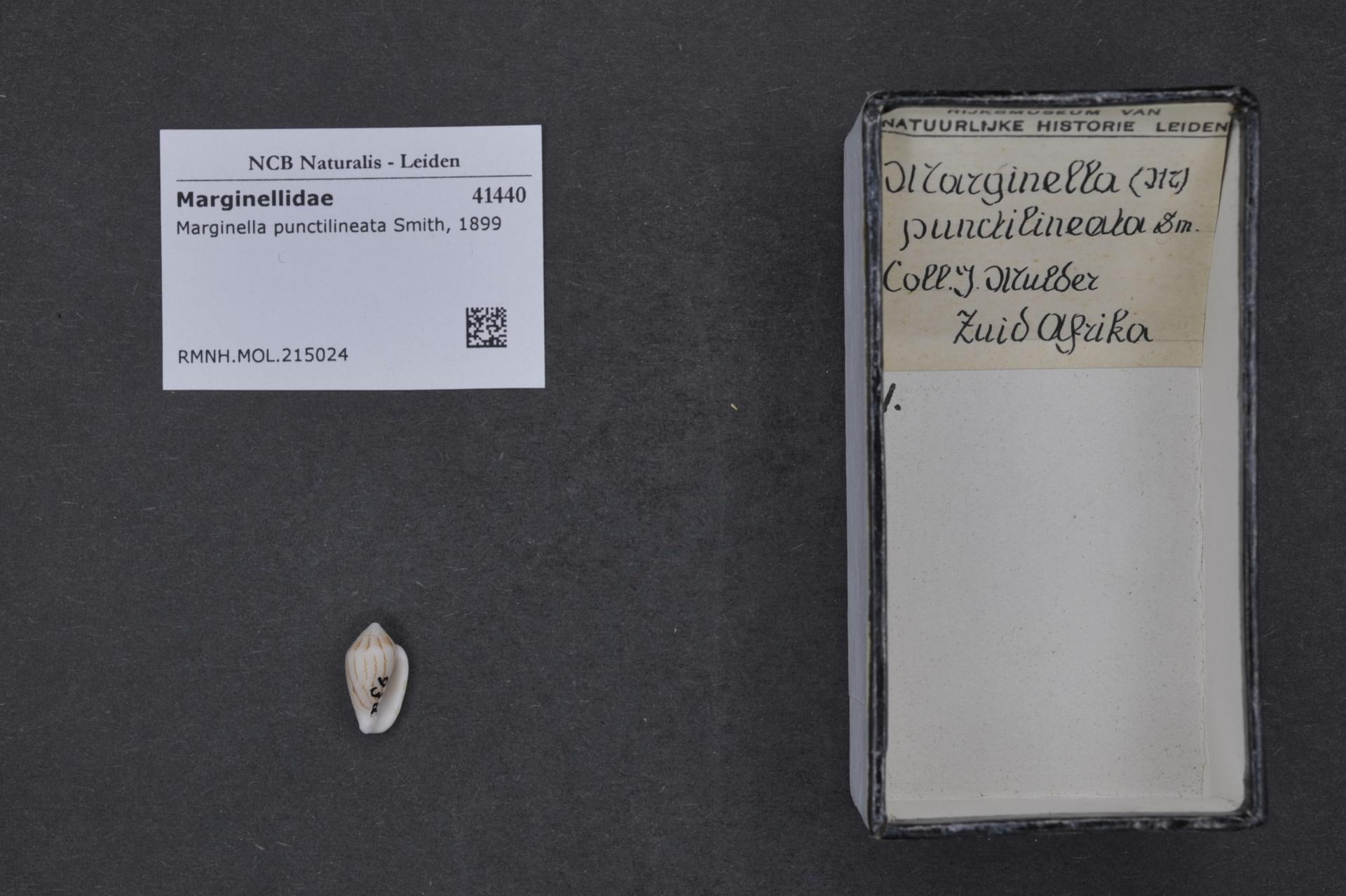

Scientific classification
- Kingdom: Animalia
- Phylum: Mollusca
- Class: Gastropoda
- Subclass: Caenogastropoda
- Order: Neogastropoda
- Family: Marginellidae
- Genus: Marginella
- Species: M. punctilineata

Binomial name
- Marginella punctilineata E.A. Smith, 1899

= Marginella punctilineata =

Species of gastropod

Marginella punctilineata is a species of sea snail, a marine gastropod mollusk in the family Marginellidae, the margin snails.
