= Pardus =

Pardus may refer to:

- Saint Pardus, patron saint of Larino, Italy
- Dan Pardus, an American NASCAR driver
- Pardus (operating system), a Linux distribution developed in Turkey
- Pardus (video game), graphical browser-based MMORPG
- Pardus, Pennsylvania, a community in the United States

== Biology ==
- Panthera pardus, the scientific name for the leopard
  - Panthera pardus pardus, African leopard
- Pseudophilautus pardus is an extinct species of Sri Lankan shrub frogs, in the family Rhacophoridae
- Ecsenius pardus, a species of blenny, a fish of the family Blenniidae
- Cystiscus pardus is a species of very small sea snail, a marine gastropod mollusk or micromollusk in the family Cystiscidae.
- Jorunna pardus, a species of sea slug in the family Discodorididae.
