= Cystiscus indiscretus =

Scientific classification
- Kingdom: Animalia
- Phylum: Mollusca
- Class: Gastropoda
- Subclass: Caenogastropoda
- Order: Neogastropoda
- Family: Cystiscidae
- Subfamily: Cystiscinae
- Genus: Cystiscus
- Species: C. indiscretus

Binomial name
- Cystiscus indiscretus (May, 1911)

Synonyms
- Marginella indiscretus May, 1911

Species of sea snail

Cystiscus indiscretus is a species of very small sea snail, a marine gastropod mollusk or micromollusk in the family Cystiscidae.
