= Cystiscus hernandezi =

Scientific classification
- Kingdom: Animalia
- Phylum: Mollusca
- Class: Gastropoda
- Subclass: Caenogastropoda
- Order: Neogastropoda
- Family: Cystiscidae
- Subfamily: Cystiscinae
- Genus: Cystiscus
- Species: C. hernandezi

Binomial name
- Cystiscus hernandezi Boyer, 2018

Species of gastropod

Cystiscus hernandezi is a species of very small sea snail, a marine gastropod mollusk or micromollusk in the family Cystiscidae.
