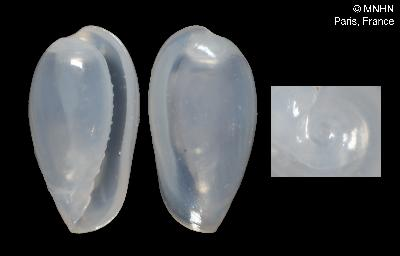
- Cystiscus yasawaensis

Scientific classification
- Kingdom: Animalia
- Phylum: Mollusca
- Class: Gastropoda
- Subclass: Caenogastropoda
- Order: Neogastropoda
- Family: Cystiscidae
- Subfamily: Cystiscinae
- Genus: Cystiscus; Stimpson, 1865

Type species
- Cystiscus capensis Stimpson, 1865

Synonyms
- Euliginella Laseron, 1957

= Cystiscus =

Genus of gastropods

Cystiscus is a taxonomic genus of minute sea snails, marine gastropod mollusks or micromollusks.

This genus was placed in the family Cystiscidae by Coovert and Coovert, 1995. Previously the genus was in the family Marginellidae, where it is still placed by many other malacologists.

== Diagnosis ==
Shell minute to small, white, hyaline; spire immersed to low; lip thickened, smooth or weakly denticulate; external varix absent; siphonal notch absent; posterior notch absent; lacking collabral parietal callus ridge; columella multiplicate, with combined usually 2 to 8 plications plus parietal lirae, first plication usually strong and raised. Mantle smooth, at least partially extending over external shell surface.

== Shell description ==
Shell minute to small (adult length 1 to 6 mm (0.039 to 0.236 in)). Color white, hyaline; surface smooth, glossy. Shape usually elliptic, obovate, or subtriangular; weakly shouldered. Spire completely immersed to low. Aperture narrow to broad, usually wider anteriorly. Lip slightly to distinctly thickened, flared posteriorly in some species, smooth on inside edge to weakly denticulate, lacking lirae, external varix absent. Shell lacking a siphonal notch and posterior notch. Shell with weak parietal callus wash or weak parietal callus deposits in some species, but lacking collabral parietal callus ridge. Columella multiplicate, with combined total 2 to 8 plications plus parietal lirae, rarely to 17 in which the posteriormost are denticles; one species with only 1 plication. Plications usually occupying less than half the length of the aperture, but most of the aperture in some. Plications excavated just inside aperture in a few species, usually evenly rounded, first plication usually raised and very strong. Shell with cystiscid internal whorls.

== Animal anatomy ==
Internal: Unknown
External: Animal with eyes at side of head, usually on lateral swelling; mantle smooth, at least partially extending onto external shell surface, in some species nearly covering shell; foot relatively narrow, about as wide as shell length; head and mantle usually uniformly colored, often bright red, orange, or yellow, or brown, or black, internal mantle color pattern often showing through translucent shell.
Radula: Uniserial, ribbon long, narrow, composed of 80-209 plates. Rachidian plates overlapping, narrow, moderately to strong arched, with 6-14 sharp cusps on posterior edge, the central cusp usually the strongest. The anterior edge of the rachidian plate is strongly concave, resulting in U- or V-shaped plates.

== Habitat ==
Intertidal to 370 m (1,210 ft).

== Fossil record ==
Eocene of France and Alabama, upper Oligogene and Miocene of Western Atlantic, to Recent.

== Remarks ==
The two halves of the head are capable of closing together at will, thus appearing unsplit. The long siphon usually distinguishes this group from Gibberula. The shell of Persicula is usually patterned, often has a distinct external varix, and the spire is usually immersed. These conchological features serve to separate the two groups.

== Species ==
Cystiscus contains the following accepted species:

- Cystiscus angasi (Crosse, 1870)
- Cystiscus aphanacme (Tomlin, 1918)
- Cystiscus aurantius Boyer, 2003
- Cystiscus beqae Wakefield & McCleery, 2006
- Cystiscus boucheti Boyer, 2003
- Cystiscus bougei (Bavay, 1917)
- Cystiscus bucca (Tomlin, 1916)
- Cystiscus caeruleus Boyer, 2003
- Cystiscus camelopardalis Boyer, 2003
- Cystiscus carinifer Wakefield & McCleery, 2005
- Cystiscus connectans (May, 1911)
- Cystiscus cooverti Boyer, 2003
- Cystiscus cratericula (Tate & May, 1900)
- Cystiscus cymbalum (Tate, 1878)
- Cystiscus cystiscus (Redfield, 1870)
- Cystiscus deeae Wakefield & McCleery, 2006
- Cystiscus deltoides Boyer, 2003
- Cystiscus flindersi (Pritchard & Gatliff, 1899)
- Cystiscus freycineti (May, 1915)
- Cystiscus garretti Wakefield & McCleery, 2006
- Cystiscus gorii Boyer, 2018
- Cystiscus goubini (Bavay, 1922)
- Cystiscus halli (Pritchard & Gatliff, 1899)
- Cystiscus havannensis Wakefield & McCleery, 2006
- Cystiscus hernandezi Boyer, 2018
- Cystiscus incertus (May, 1920)
- Cystiscus indiscretus (May, 1911)
- Cystiscus iota (Hedley, 1899)
- Cystiscus jucundus (W. Turton, 1932)
- Cystiscus mainardii Cossignani, 2009
- Cystiscus maloloensis Wakefield & McCleery, 2006
- Cystiscus manceli (Jousseaume, 1875)
- Cystiscus marshalli Boyer, 2003
- Cystiscus maskelynensis Wakefield & McCleery, 2006
- Cystiscus matoensis Wakefield & McCleery, 2006
- Cystiscus melwardi (Laseron, 1957)
- Cystiscus microgonia (Dall, 1927)
- Cystiscus minor Boyer, 2003
- Cystiscus minusculus Lussi & G. Smith, 1998
- Cystiscus minutissimus (Tenison Woods, 1876)
- Cystiscus montrouzieri (Bavay, 1922)
- Cystiscus mosaica Wakefield & McCleery, 2005
- Cystiscus nebulosa Wakefield & McCleery, 2005
- Cystiscus obesulus (May, 1920)
- Cystiscus pardus Boyer, 2003
- Cystiscus peelae Lussi & G. Smith, 1998
- Cystiscus politus (Carpenter, 1857)
- Cystiscus problematicus (Gatliff & Gabriel, 1916)
- Cystiscus pseudoaurantius Boyer, 2003
- Cystiscus pseustes (E. A. Smith, 1904)
- Cystiscus punctatus Boyer, 2003
- Cystiscus pusillus Wakefield & McCleery, 2006
- Cystiscus rendai Boyer, 2018
- Cystiscus robini Boyer, 2018
- † Cystiscus rotunda (May, 1922)
- Cystiscus sandwicensis (Pease, 1860)
- Cystiscus subauriculatus (May, 1915)
- Cystiscus thouinensis (May, 1915)
- Cystiscus tomlinianus (May, 1918)
- Cystiscus triangularis Cossignani, 2008
- Cystiscus tricinctus Boyer, 2003
- Cystiscus truncatus (Dall, 1927)
- Cystiscus vavauensis Wakefield & McCleery, 2006
- Cystiscus viaderi Boyer, 2004
- Cystiscus vidae (Dell, 1956)
- Cystiscus viridis Boyer, 2003
- Cystiscus vitiensis Wakefield & McCleery, 2006
- Cystiscus wakefieldi T. Cossignani, 2001
- Cystiscus yasawaensis Wakefield & McCleery, 2006
