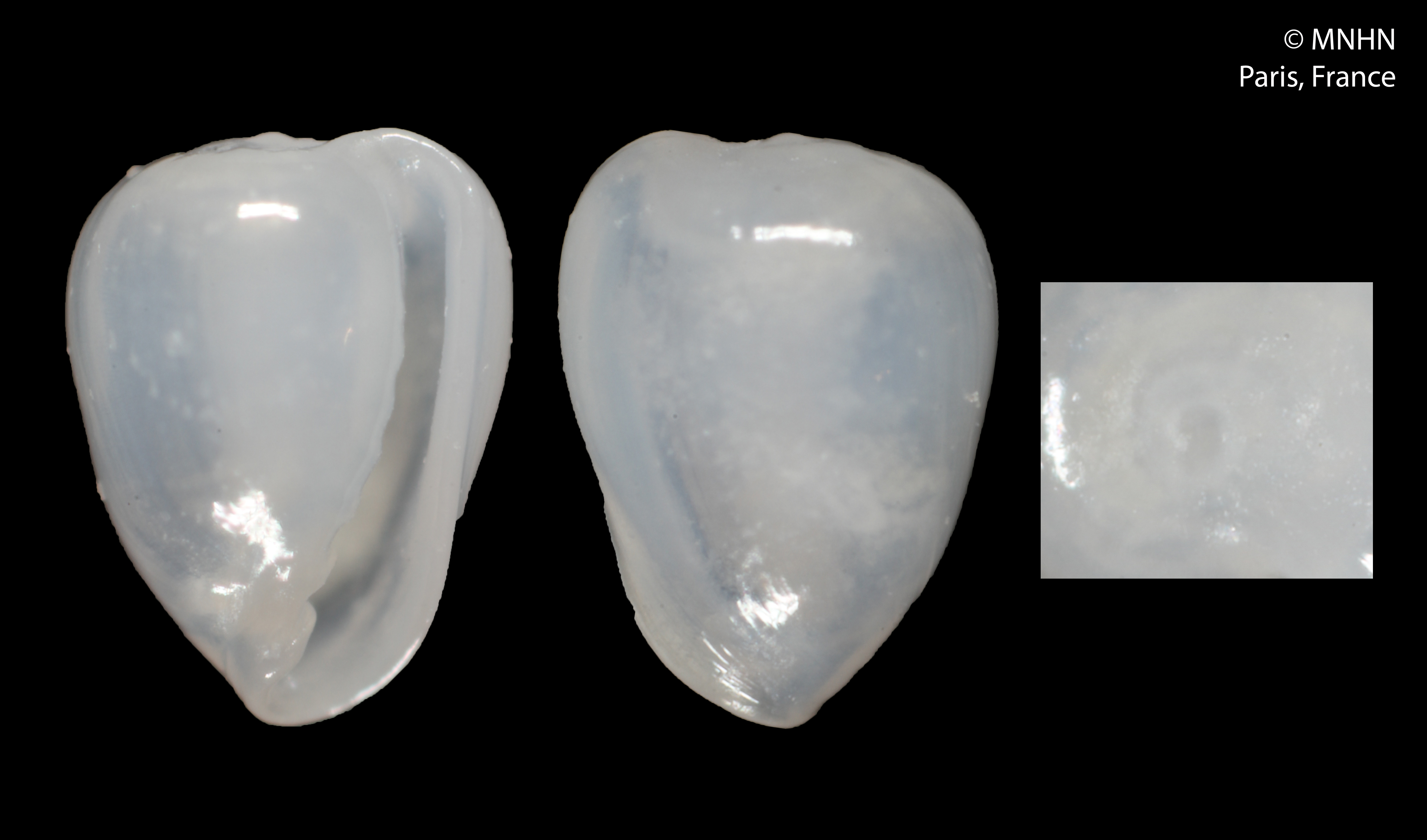
- Shell of Cystiscus mosaica (holotype at MNHN, Paris)

Scientific classification
- Kingdom: Animalia
- Phylum: Mollusca
- Class: Gastropoda
- Subclass: Caenogastropoda
- Order: Neogastropoda
- Family: Cystiscidae
- Subfamily: Cystiscinae
- Genus: Cystiscus
- Species: C. mosaica

Binomial name
- Cystiscus mosaica Wakefield & McCleery, 2005

= Cystiscus mosaica =

Species of gastropod

Cystiscus mosaica is a species of very small sea snail, a marine gastropod mollusk or micromollusk in the family Cystiscidae.

== Description ==
The size of the shell attains 1.51 mm.

== Distribution ==
This marine species occurs off the Tuamotu Islands.
