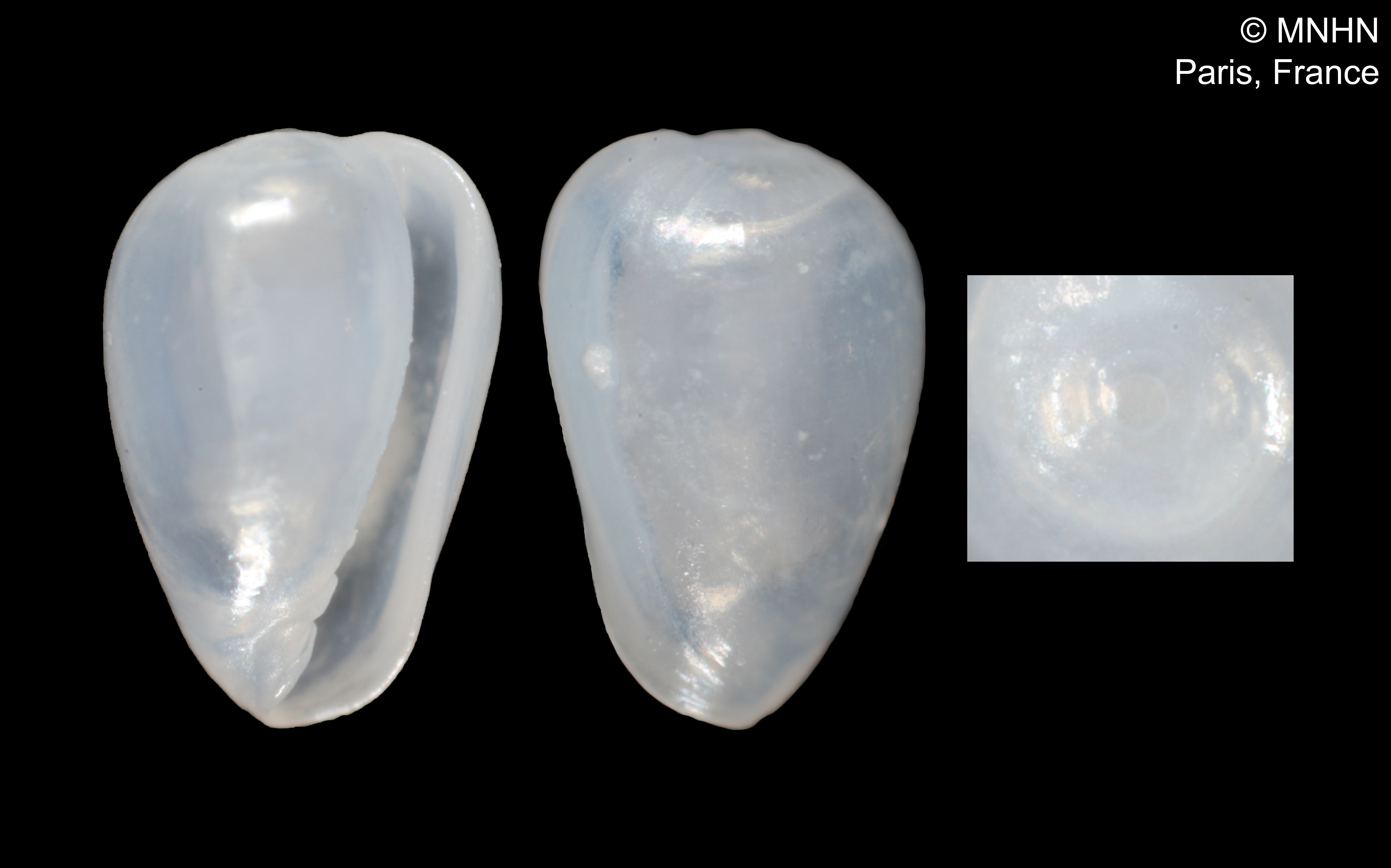
- Shell of Cystiscus maskelynensis (holotype at MNHN, Paris)

Scientific classification
- Kingdom: Animalia
- Phylum: Mollusca
- Class: Gastropoda
- Subclass: Caenogastropoda
- Order: Neogastropoda
- Family: Cystiscidae
- Subfamily: Cystiscinae
- Genus: Cystiscus
- Species: C. maskelynensis

Binomial name
- Cystiscus maskelynensis Wakefield & McCleery, 2005

= Cystiscus maskelynensis =

Species of gastropod

Cystiscus maskelynensis is a species of very small sea snail, a marine gastropod mollusk or micromollusk in the family Cystiscidae.

== Description ==
The size of the shell attains 1.66 mm.

== Distribution ==
This marine species occurs off Vanuatu.
