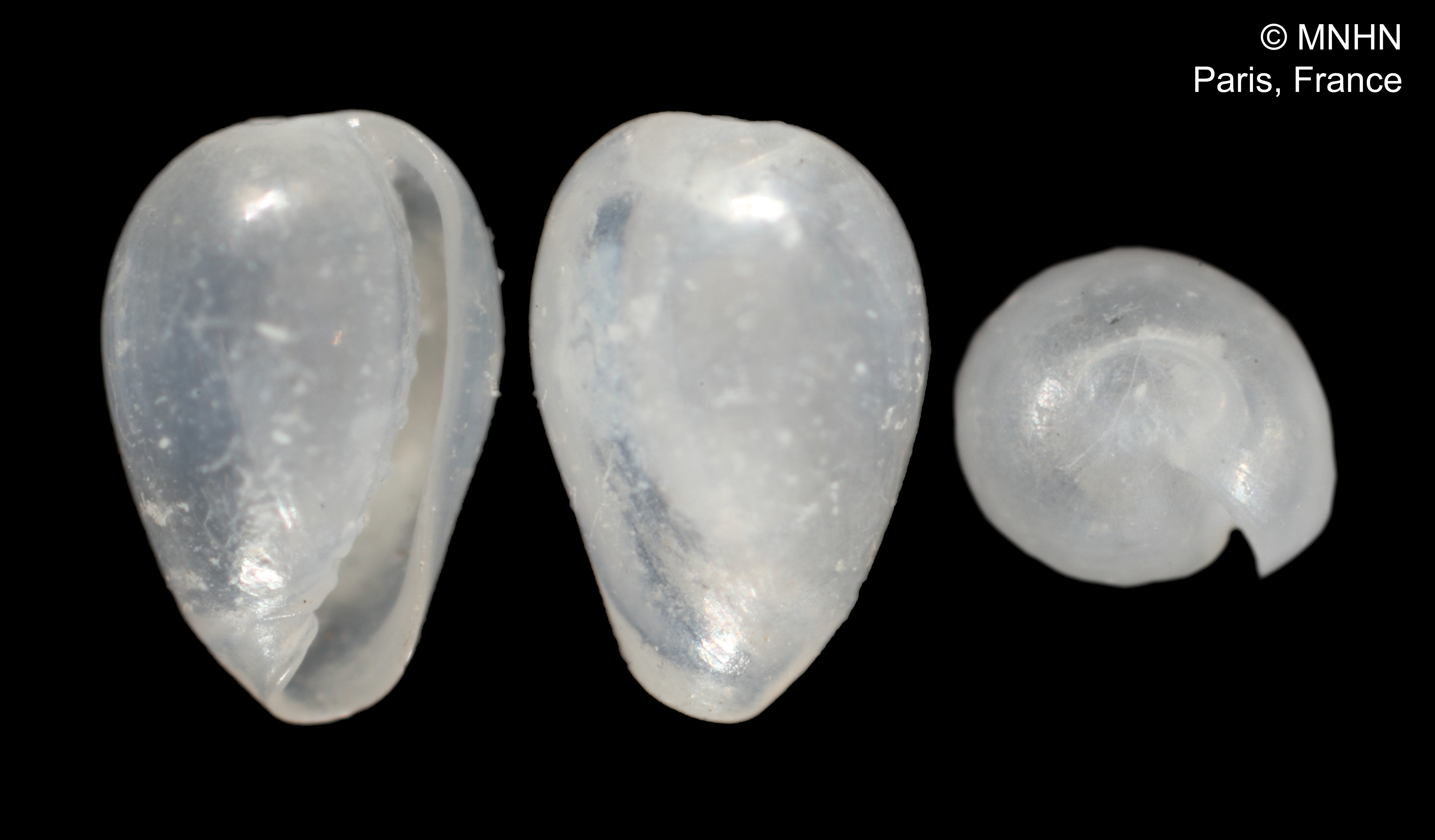
- Shell of Cystiscus montrouzieri (lectotype at MNHN, Paris)

Scientific classification
- Kingdom: Animalia
- Phylum: Mollusca
- Class: Gastropoda
- Subclass: Caenogastropoda
- Order: Neogastropoda
- Family: Cystiscidae
- Subfamily: Cystiscinae
- Genus: Cystiscus
- Species: C. montrouzieri

Binomial name
- Cystiscus montrouzieri (Bavay, 1922)

Synonyms
- Marginella montrouzieri Bavay, 1922

= Cystiscus montrouzieri =

Species of gastropod

Cystiscus montrouzieri is a species of very small sea snail, a marine gastropod mollusk or micromollusk in the family Cystiscidae.

== Description ==
The size of the shell attains 1.55 mm.

== Distribution ==
This marine shell occurs off New Caledonia.
