= Cystiscus thouinensis =

Scientific classification
- Kingdom: Animalia
- Phylum: Mollusca
- Class: Gastropoda
- Subclass: Caenogastropoda
- Order: Neogastropoda
- Family: Cystiscidae
- Subfamily: Cystiscinae
- Genus: Cystiscus
- Species: C. thouinensis

Binomial name
- Cystiscus thouinensis (May, 1915)

Synonyms
- Marginella thouinensis May, 1915

Species of gastropod

Cystiscus thouinensis is a species of very small sea snail, a marine gastropod mollusk or micromollusk in the family Cystiscidae.
