= Cystiscus flindersi =

Scientific classification
- Kingdom: Animalia
- Phylum: Mollusca
- Class: Gastropoda
- Subclass: Caenogastropoda
- Order: Neogastropoda
- Family: Cystiscidae
- Subfamily: Cystiscinae
- Genus: Cystiscus
- Species: C. flindersi

Binomial name
- Cystiscus flindersi (Pritchard & Gatliff, 1899)

Synonyms
- Marginella flindersi Pritchard & Gatliff, 1899

Species of gastropod

Cystiscus flindersi is a species of very small sea snail, a marine gastropod mollusk or micromollusk in the family Cystiscidae.
