= Cystiscus goubini =

Scientific classification
- Kingdom: Animalia
- Phylum: Mollusca
- Class: Gastropoda
- Subclass: Caenogastropoda
- Order: Neogastropoda
- Family: Cystiscidae
- Subfamily: Cystiscinae
- Genus: Cystiscus
- Species: C. goubini

Binomial name
- Cystiscus goubini (Bavay, 1922)

Synonyms
- Marginella goubini Bavay, 1922

Species of gastropod

Cystiscus goubini is a species of very small sea snail, a marine gastropod mollusk or micromollusk in the family Cystiscidae.
