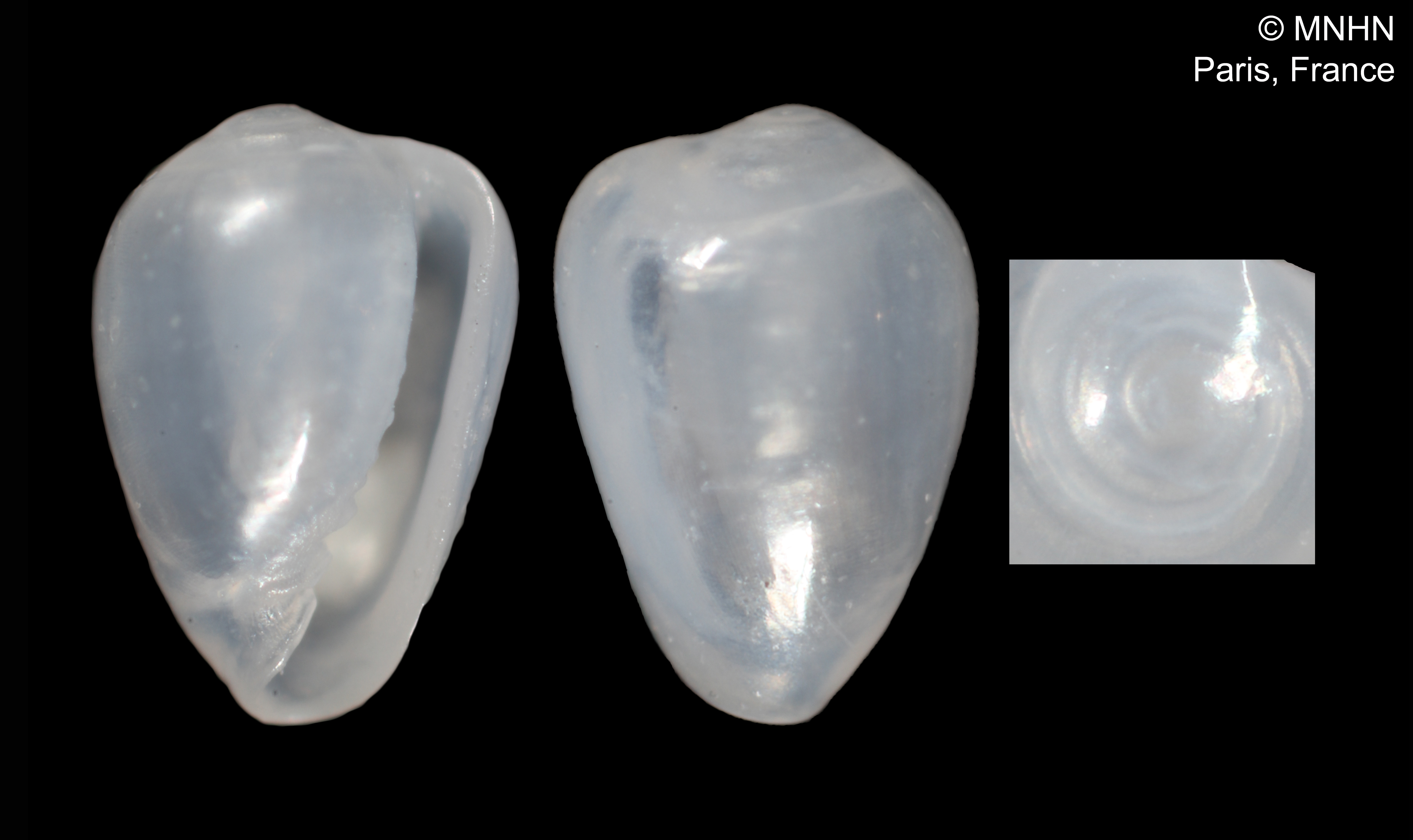
- Shell of Cystiscus beqae (holotype at MNHN, Paris)

Scientific classification
- Kingdom: Animalia
- Phylum: Mollusca
- Class: Gastropoda
- Subclass: Caenogastropoda
- Order: Neogastropoda
- Family: Cystiscidae
- Subfamily: Cystiscinae
- Genus: Cystiscus
- Species: C. beqae

Binomial name
- Cystiscus beqae Wakefield & McCleery, 2006

= Cystiscus beqae =

Species of gastropod

Cystiscus beqae is a species of very small sea snail, a marine gastropod mollusk or micromollusk in the family Cystiscidae.

== Description ==
The size of the shell attains 1.46 mm.

== Distribution ==
This marine species was found off Beqa Island, Fiji.
