= Cystiscus connectans =

Scientific classification
- Kingdom: Animalia
- Phylum: Mollusca
- Class: Gastropoda
- Subclass: Caenogastropoda
- Order: Neogastropoda
- Family: Cystiscidae
- Subfamily: Cystiscinae
- Genus: Cystiscus
- Species: C. connectans

Binomial name
- Cystiscus connectans (May, 1911)

Synonyms
- Marginella connectans May, 1911

Species of gastropod

Cystiscus connectans is a species of very small sea snail, a marine gastropod mollusk or micromollusk in the family Cystiscidae.
