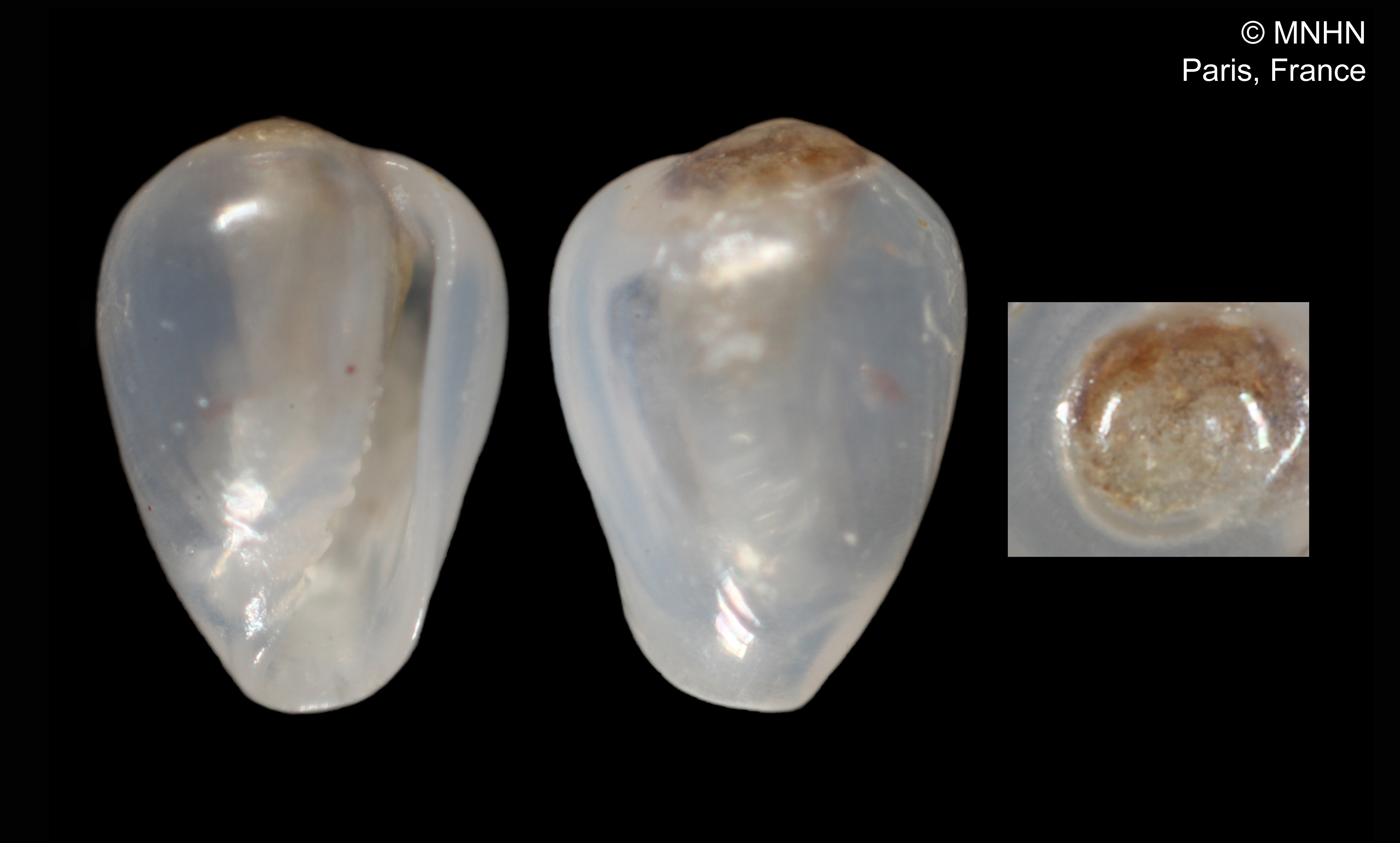
- Shell of Cystiscus deeae (holotype at MNHN, Paris)

Scientific classification
- Kingdom: Animalia
- Phylum: Mollusca
- Class: Gastropoda
- Subclass: Caenogastropoda
- Order: Neogastropoda
- Family: Cystiscidae
- Subfamily: Cystiscinae
- Genus: Cystiscus
- Species: C. deeae

Binomial name
- Cystiscus deeae Wakefield & McCleery, 2006

= Cystiscus deeae =

Species of gastropod

Cystiscus deeae is a species of very small sea snail, a marine gastropod mollusk or micromollusk in the family Cystiscidae.

== Description ==
The size of the shell of this attains 1.23 mm.

This predatorial bottom feeder is primarily yellow, with small red eyes.

== Distribution ==
This marine species occurs off Kenutu Island, Tonga.
