= Cystiscus cratericula =

Scientific classification
- Kingdom: Animalia
- Phylum: Mollusca
- Class: Gastropoda
- Subclass: Caenogastropoda
- Order: Neogastropoda
- Family: Cystiscidae
- Subfamily: Cystiscinae
- Genus: Cystiscus
- Species: C. cratericula

Binomial name
- Cystiscus cratericula (Tate & May, 1900)

Synonyms
- Marginella cratericula Tate & May, 1900

Species of gastropod

Cystiscus cratericula is a species of very small sea snail, a marine gastropod mollusk or micromollusk in the family Cystiscidae.
