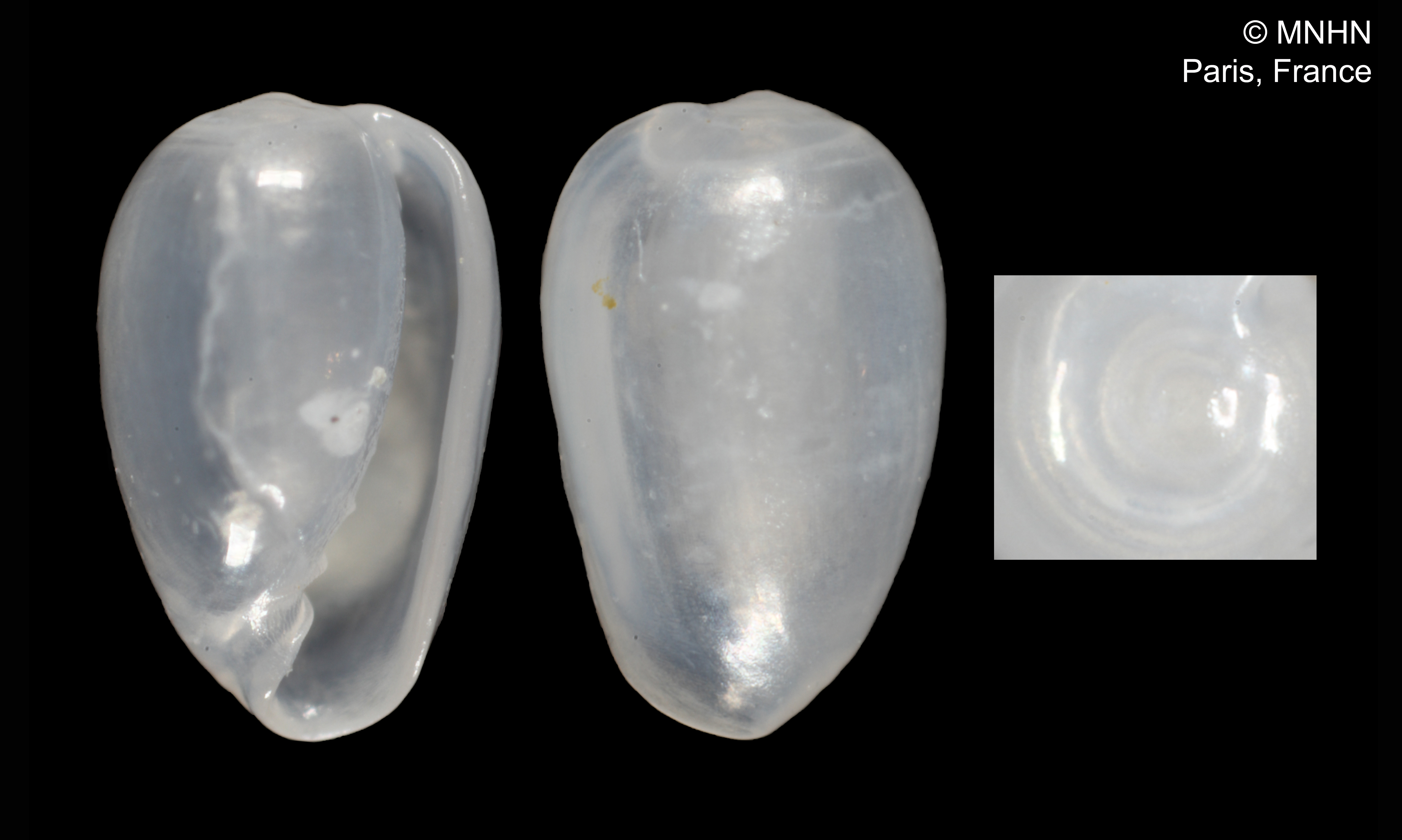
- Shell of Cystiscus matoensis (holotype at MNHN, Paris)

Scientific classification
- Kingdom: Animalia
- Phylum: Mollusca
- Class: Gastropoda
- Subclass: Caenogastropoda
- Order: Neogastropoda
- Family: Cystiscidae
- Subfamily: Cystiscinae
- Genus: Cystiscus
- Species: C. matoensis

Binomial name
- Cystiscus matoensis Wakefield & McCleery, 2006

= Cystiscus matoensis =

Species of gastropod

Cystiscus matoensis is a species of very small sea snail, a marine gastropod mollusk or micromollusk in the family Cystiscidae.

== Description ==
The size of the shell attains 1.94 mm.

== Distribution ==
This marine species occurs off New Caledonia. generally found on the southern coast.
