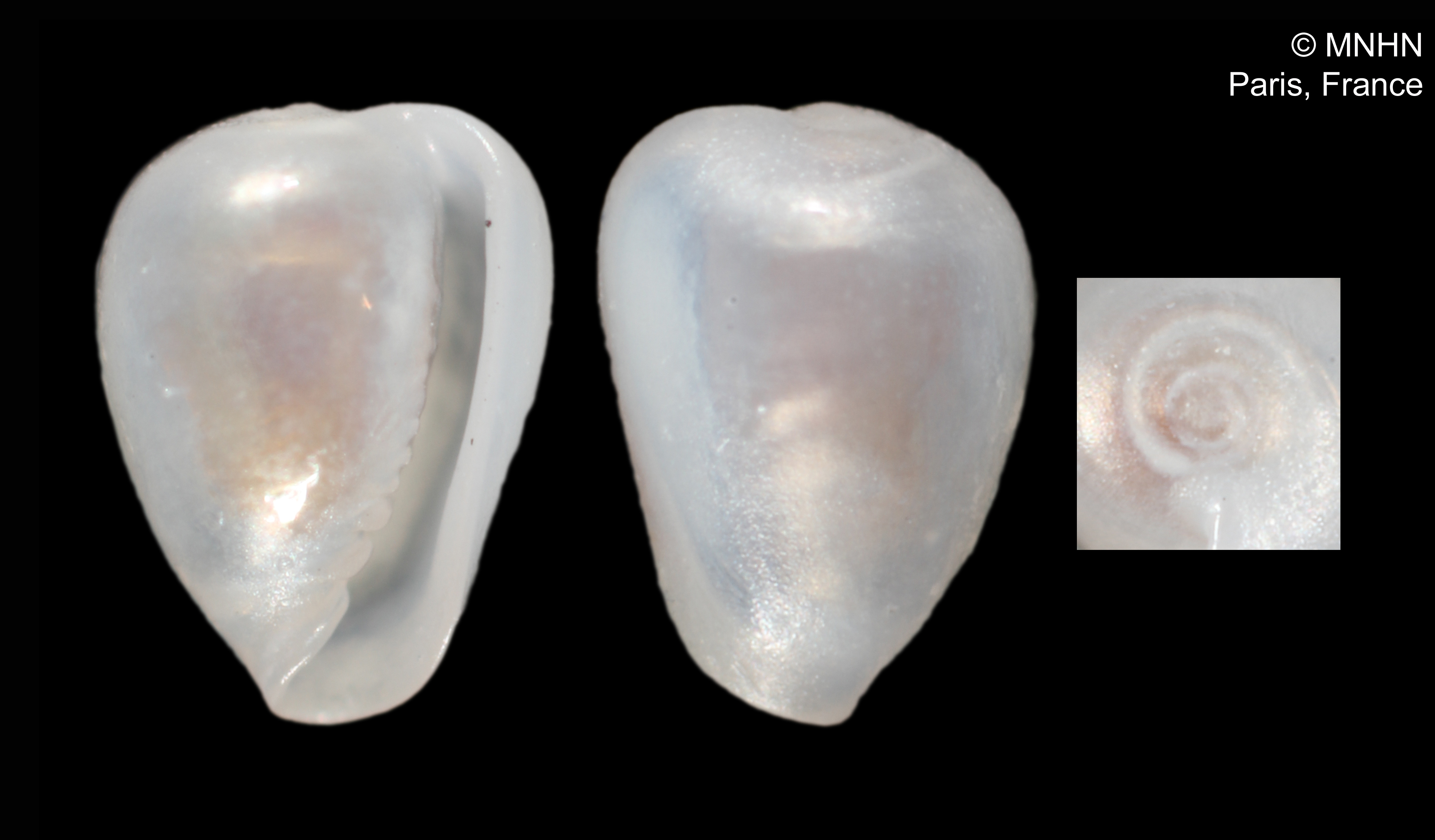
- Shell of Cystiscus minor (holotype at MNHN, Paris)

Scientific classification
- Kingdom: Animalia
- Phylum: Mollusca
- Class: Gastropoda
- Subclass: Caenogastropoda
- Order: Neogastropoda
- Family: Cystiscidae
- Subfamily: Cystiscinae
- Genus: Cystiscus
- Species: C. minor

Binomial name
- Cystiscus minor Boyer, 2003

= Cystiscus minor =

Species of gastropod

Cystiscus minor is a species of very small, predatory sea snail, a marine gastropod mollusk or micromollusk in the family Cystiscidae and genus Cystiscus. The name derives from the small size of the species. In its northern distribution, it is common and lives in dense populations.

== Description ==
The size of the shell is around 1.2 by 0.8 mm and is described as translucent white, short, and subtriangular. The spire is faintly produced, with a teat-like protoconch. The shell has an elevated labrum that is arched in its upper part but straight in its central and lower part. The aperture is narrow, faintly widening to the base. The inner lip is smooth, with three anterior columellar plaits and seven faint parietal varix. The shell morphology is described as constant.

The animal is described as having a bifurcated head with short frontal lobes, with a small, triangular foot. The chromatism is described as being somewhat variable. The head is white in color, fringed with light orange and a reddish-orange around the central slit, however, the light orange zones on the head periphery are sometimes replaced by creamy yellow zones that are restricted to the frontal lobes. This color difference seems to be associated with local distribution. The foot is mottled opaque white and or light yellow with a fine red fringe ahead. The inner mantle is white with beige, or may be a deep white. The eyes are red.

== Distribution ==
This marine snail occurs off New Caledonia, in the Pacific Ocean. The holotype specimen described was found in sandy and cliff-like environments on the rocky floor of the warm shallows of the Manglia Reef in Touho area, on the east coast of the main island, Grande Terre. The area was extensively explored in 1993, recovering 2,738 species of marine molluscs, many of which were previously undescribed, with 20% of the species represented by single specimens. This is several times the number of species recorded from any comparable study area anywhere in the world.
