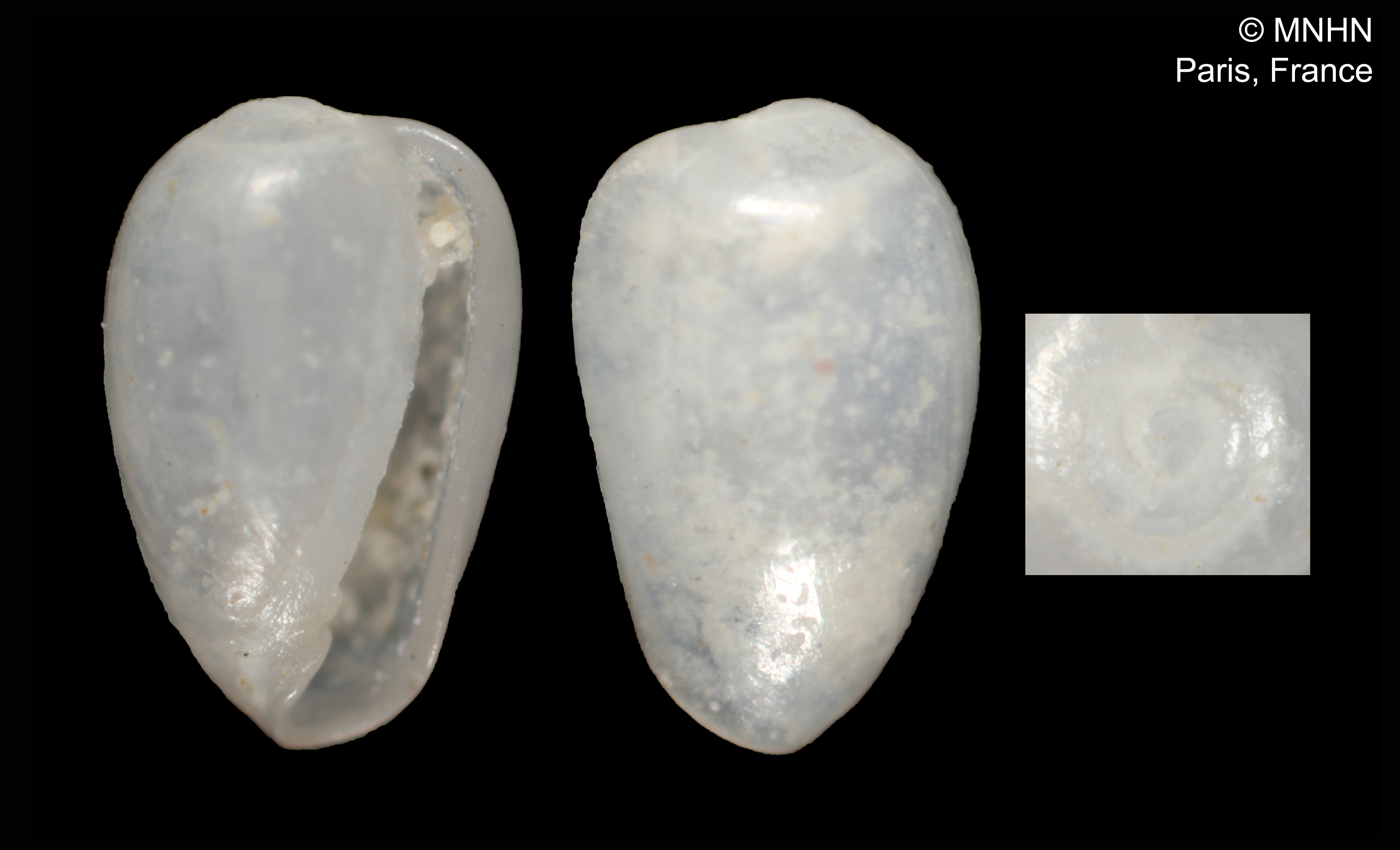
- Shell of Cystiscus viaderi (holotype at MNHN, Paris)

Scientific classification
- Kingdom: Animalia
- Phylum: Mollusca
- Class: Gastropoda
- Subclass: Caenogastropoda
- Order: Neogastropoda
- Family: Cystiscidae
- Subfamily: Cystiscinae
- Genus: Cystiscus
- Species: C. viaderi

Binomial name
- Cystiscus viaderi Boyer, 2004

= Cystiscus viaderi =

Species of gastropod

Cystiscus viaderi is a species of very small sea snail, a marine gastropod mollusk or micromollusk in the family Cystiscidae.

== Description ==
The length of the shell attains 1.5 mm.

== Distribution ==
This species occurs in the Indian Ocean off Mauritius.
