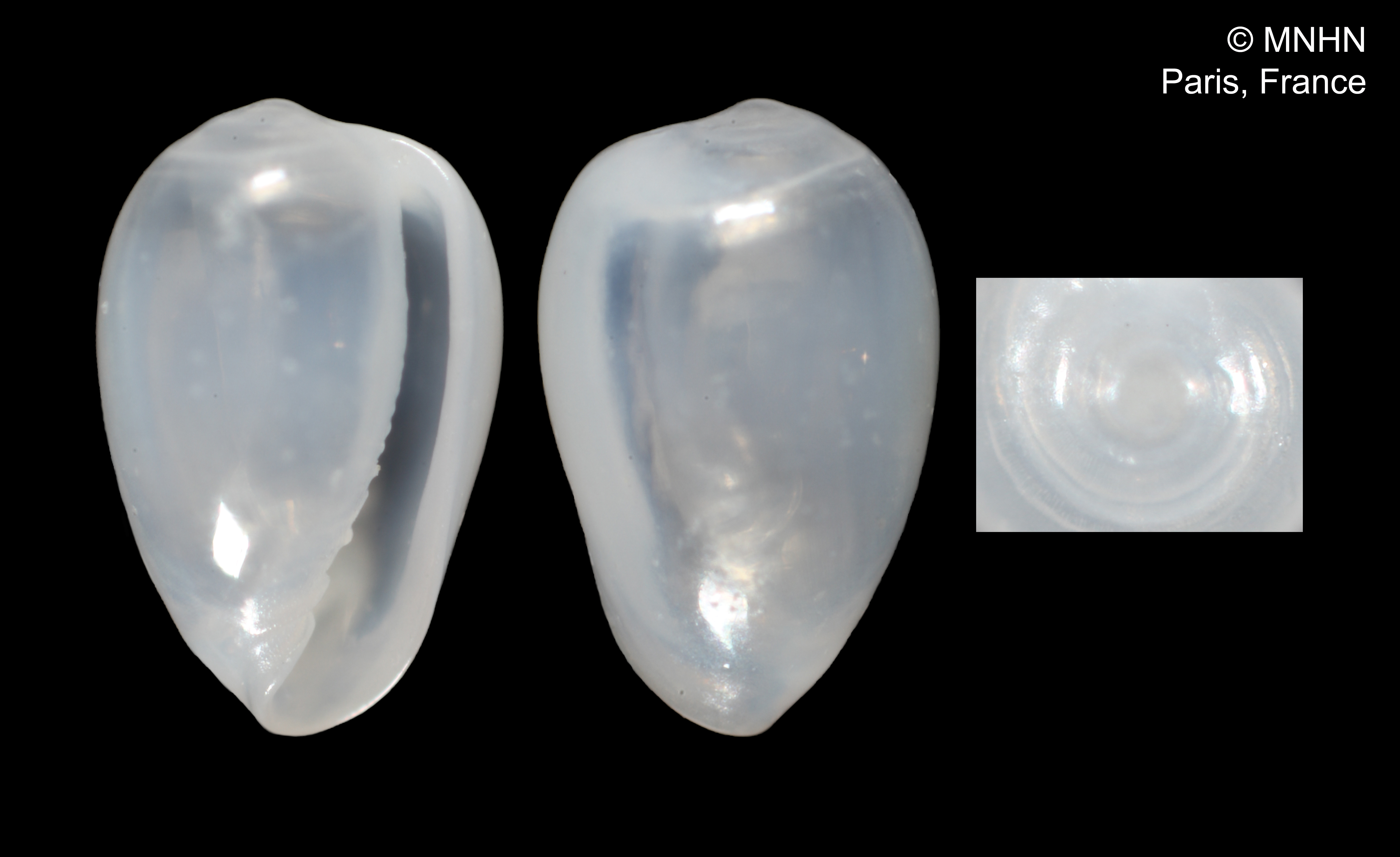
- Shell of Cystiscus vavauensis (holotype at MNHN, Paris)

Scientific classification
- Kingdom: Animalia
- Phylum: Mollusca
- Class: Gastropoda
- Subclass: Caenogastropoda
- Order: Neogastropoda
- Family: Cystiscidae
- Subfamily: Cystiscinae
- Genus: Cystiscus
- Species: C. vavauensis

Binomial name
- Cystiscus vavauensis Wakefield & McCleery, 2006

= Cystiscus vavauensis =

Species of gastropod

Cystiscus vavauensis is a species of very small sea snail, a marine gastropod mollusk or micromollusk in the family Cystiscidae.

== Description ==
The size of the shell attains 1.77 mm.

The following is from the Wikipedia page for the genus Cystiscus:

Shell minute to small (adult length 1 to 6 mm (0.039 to 0.236 in)). Color white, hyaline; surface smooth, glossy. Shape usually elliptic, obovate, or subtriangular; weakly shouldered. Spire completely immersed to low. Aperture narrow to broad, usually wider anteriorly. Lip slightly to distinctly thickened, flared posteriorly in some species, smooth on inside edge to weakly denticulate, lacking lirae, external varix absent. Shell lacking a siphonal notch and posterior notch. Shell with weak parietal callus wash or weak parietal callus deposits in some species, but lacking collabral parietal callus ridge. Columella multiplicate, with combined total 2 to 8 plications plus parietal lirae, rarely to 17 in which the posteriormost are denticles; one species with only 1 plication. Plications usually occupying less than half the length of the aperture, but most of the aperture in some. Plications excavated just inside aperture in a few species, usually evenly rounded, first plication usually raised and very strong. Shell with cystiscid internal whorls.

== Distribution ==
This marine species occurs off Tonga.
