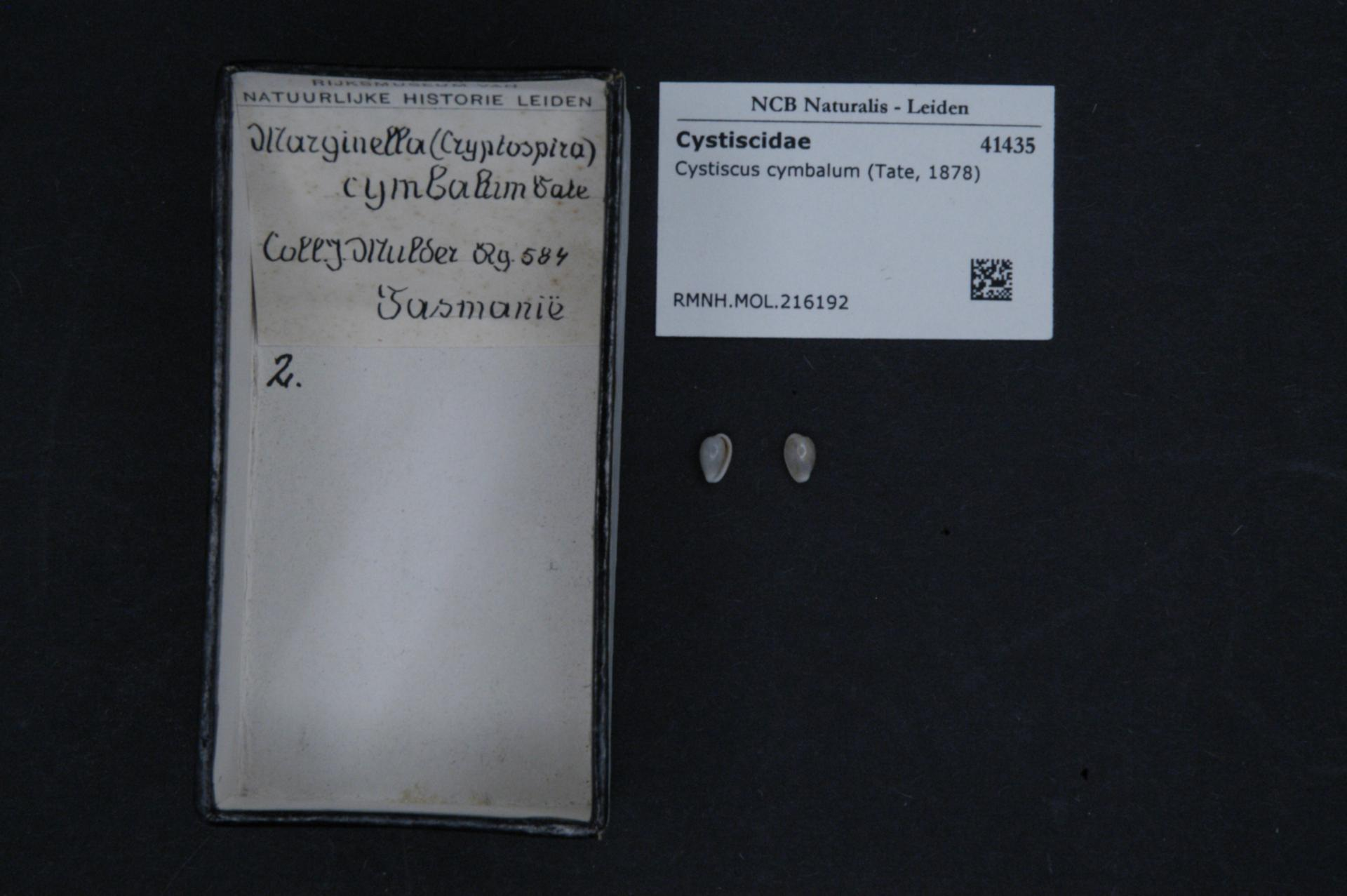
- Cystiscus cymbalum (Tate, 1878)

Scientific classification
- Kingdom: Animalia
- Phylum: Mollusca
- Class: Gastropoda
- Subclass: Caenogastropoda
- Order: Neogastropoda
- Family: Cystiscidae
- Subfamily: Cystiscinae
- Genus: Cystiscus
- Species: C. cymbalum

Binomial name
- Cystiscus cymbalum (Tate, 1878)

Synonyms
- Persicula pisiformis Thiele, 1930

= Cystiscus cymbalum =

Species of gastropod

Cystiscus cymbalum is a species of very small sea snail, a marine gastropod mollusk or micromollusk in the family Cystiscidae.
