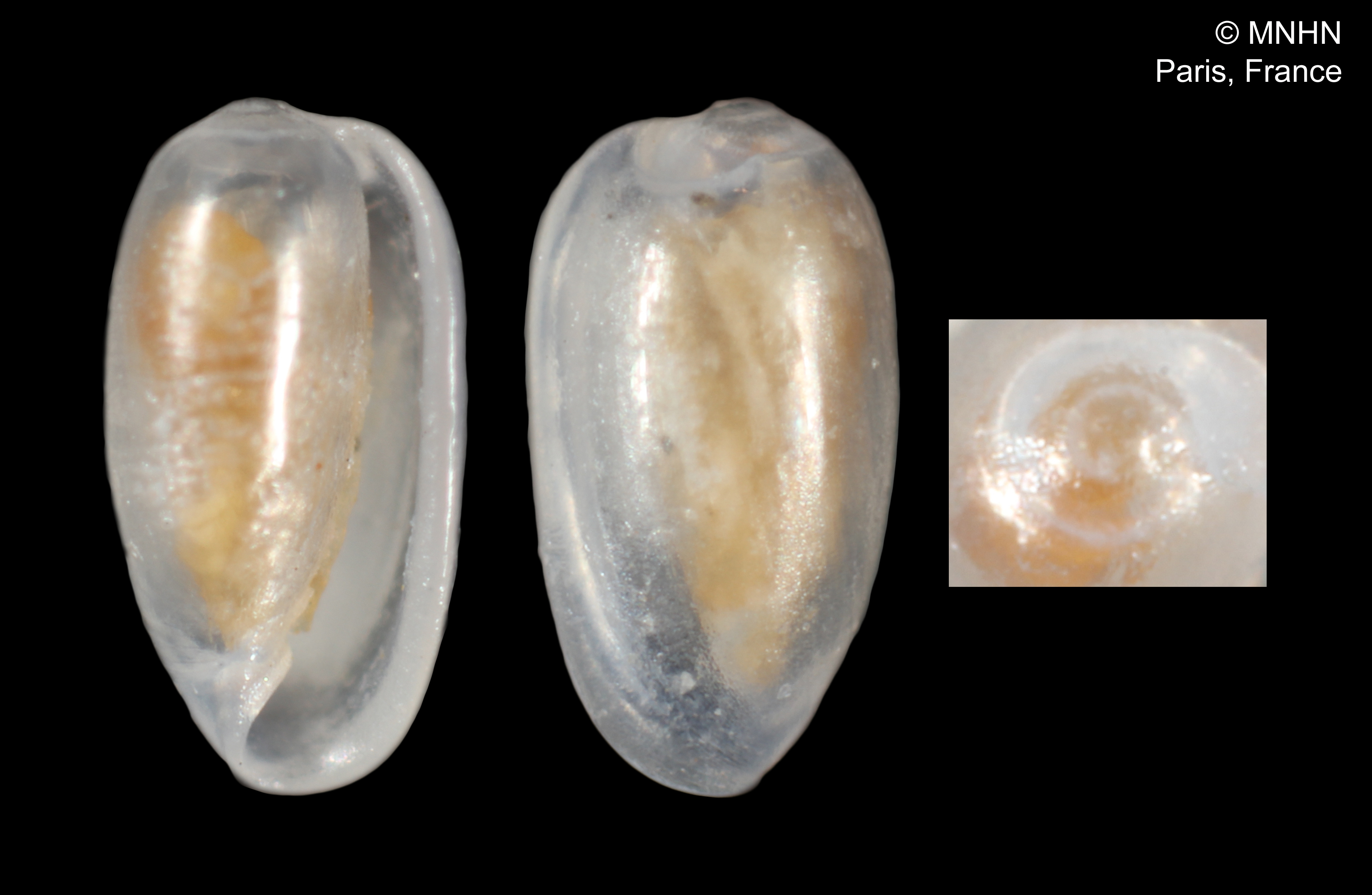
- Shell of Cystiscus camelopardalis (holotype at MNHN, Paris)

Scientific classification
- Kingdom: Animalia
- Phylum: Mollusca
- Class: Gastropoda
- Subclass: Caenogastropoda
- Order: Neogastropoda
- Family: Cystiscidae
- Subfamily: Cystiscinae
- Genus: Cystiscus
- Species: C. camelopardalis

Binomial name
- Cystiscus camelopardalis Boyer, 2003

= Cystiscus camelopardalis =

Species of gastropod

Cystiscus camelopardalis is a species of very small sea snail, a marine gastropod mollusk or micromollusk in the family Cystiscidae.

== Description ==
The length of the shell attains 1.3 mm.

== Distribution ==
This marine species occurs off New Caledonia.
