= Cystiscus manceli =

Scientific classification
- Kingdom: Animalia
- Phylum: Mollusca
- Class: Gastropoda
- Subclass: Caenogastropoda
- Order: Neogastropoda
- Family: Cystiscidae
- Subfamily: Cystiscinae
- Genus: Cystiscus
- Species: C. manceli

Binomial name
- Cystiscus manceli (Jousseaume, 1875)

Synonyms
- Closia manceli Jousseaume, 1875 (original combination); Marginella manceli (Jousseaume, 1875)

Species of gastropod

Cystiscus manceli is a species of sea snail, a marine gastropod mollusk in the family Cystiscidae.

== Distribution ==
This marine species occurs in the Mascarene Basin.
