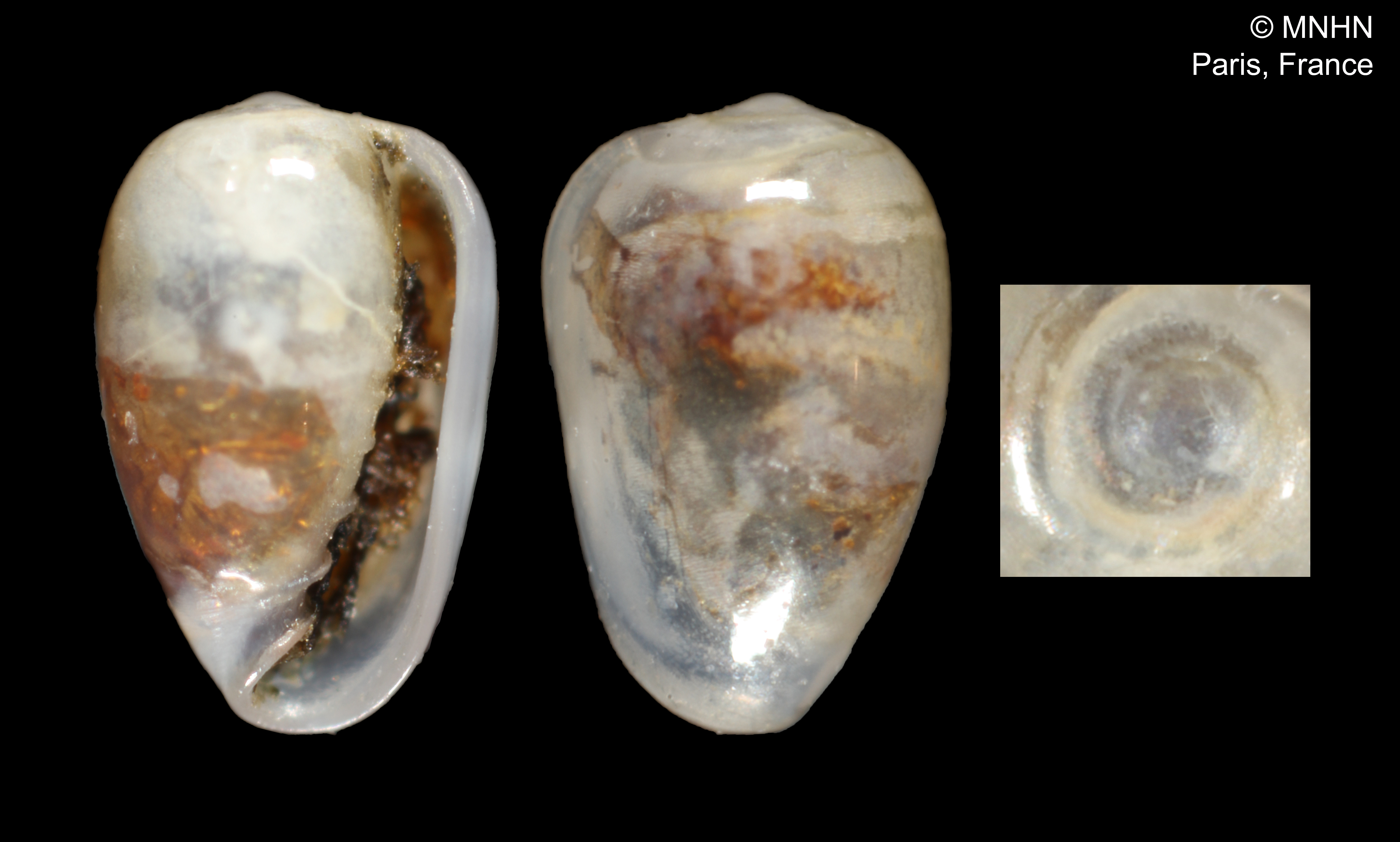
- Shell of Cystiscus havannensis (holotype at MNHN, Paris)

Scientific classification
- Kingdom: Animalia
- Phylum: Mollusca
- Class: Gastropoda
- Subclass: Caenogastropoda
- Order: Neogastropoda
- Family: Cystiscidae
- Subfamily: Cystiscinae
- Genus: Cystiscus
- Species: C. havannensis

Binomial name
- Cystiscus havannensis Wakefield & McCleery, 2006

= Cystiscus havannensis =

Species of gastropod

Cystiscus havannensis is a species of very small sea snail, a marine gastropod mollusk or micromollusk in the family Cystiscidae.

== Description ==
The size of the shell attains 1.73 mm. Shell is minute, hyaline, thin, translucent white, glossy and smooth. It has a low, rounded spire with 2 whorls tapering to the base. Its head and tentacles are opaque orange.

== Distribution ==
This marine species occurs off Vanuatu in very shallow, muddy pass with algae growth on the dead coral.
