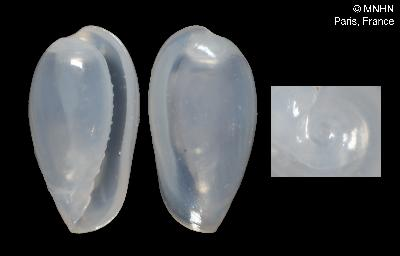
- Cystiscus yasawaensis

Scientific classification
- Kingdom: Animalia
- Phylum: Mollusca
- Class: Gastropoda
- Subclass: Caenogastropoda
- Order: Neogastropoda
- Family: Cystiscidae
- Subfamily: Cystiscinae
- Genus: Cystiscus
- Species: C. yasawaensis

Binomial name
- Cystiscus yasawaensis Wakefield & McCleery, 2006

= Cystiscus yasawaensis =

Species of gastropod

Cystiscus yasawaensis is a species of very small sea snail, a marine gastropod mollusk or micromollusk in the family Cystiscidae.

== Description ==
The shell can grow to be 2.2 mm in length.

== Distribution ==
Cystiscus yasawaensis can be found off the coast of Fiji.
