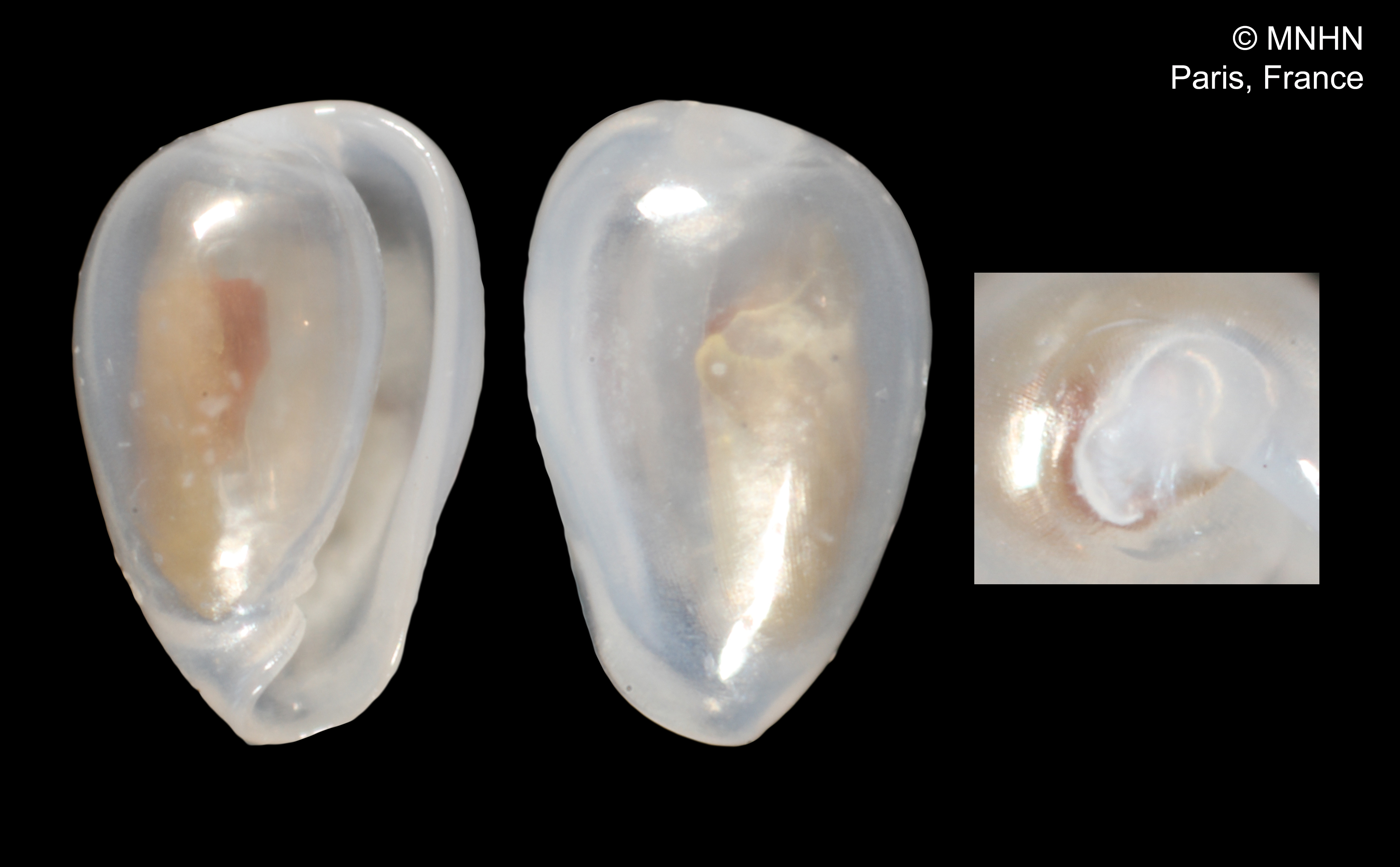
- Shell of Cystiscus cooverti (holotype at MNHN, Paris)

Scientific classification
- Kingdom: Animalia
- Phylum: Mollusca
- Class: Gastropoda
- Subclass: Caenogastropoda
- Order: Neogastropoda
- Family: Cystiscidae
- Subfamily: Cystiscinae
- Genus: Cystiscus
- Species: C. cooverti

Binomial name
- Cystiscus cooverti Boyer, 2003

= Cystiscus cooverti =

Species of gastropod

Cystiscus cooverti is a species of very small sea snail, a marine gastropod mollusk or micromollusk in the family Cystiscidae.

== Description ==
Cysticus cooverti is approximately 1.4 millimetres (0.055 in) x 0.85 millimetres (0.033 in) in size, with a characteristic translucent white shell. Other notable features include its size, its curvy mouth, and its thin, oval outline.

== Distribution ==
This marine species occurs off New Caledonia in Koumac, northwest of the mainland of the colony. It is found between 15 metres (49 ft) and 26 metres (85 ft) below sea level. The species lives in a hard bottom habitat.

== Etymology ==
The species name, cooverti, comes from marine biologist Gary Coovert, whose work played a significant role in the discovery of marginellid gastropods.
