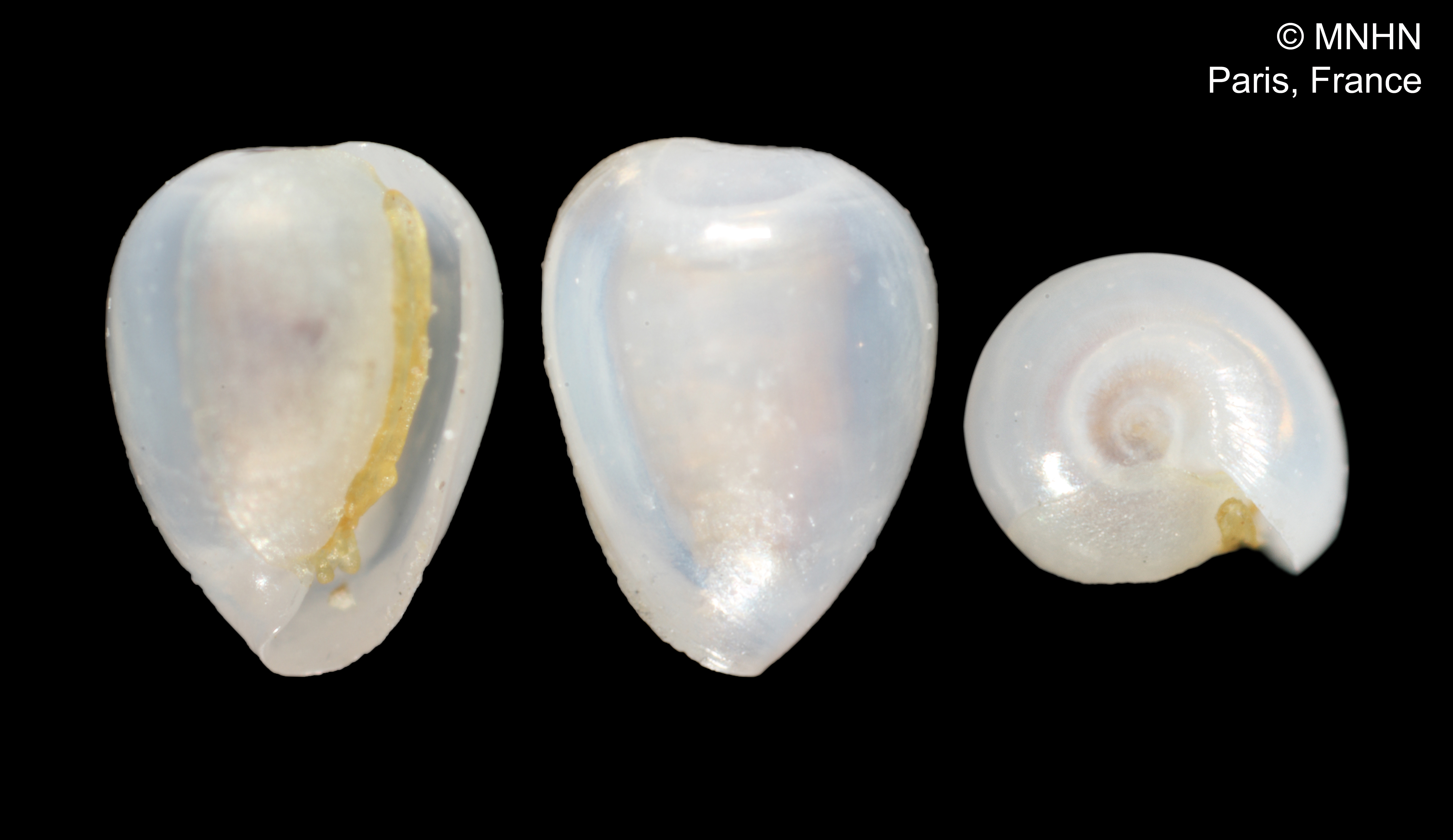
- Shell of Cystiscus pardus (holotype at MNHN, Paris)

Scientific classification
- Kingdom: Animalia
- Phylum: Mollusca
- Class: Gastropoda
- Subclass: Caenogastropoda
- Order: Neogastropoda
- Family: Cystiscidae
- Subfamily: Cystiscinae
- Genus: Cystiscus
- Species: C. pardus

Binomial name
- Cystiscus pardus Boyer, 2003

= Cystiscus pardus =

Species of gastropod

Cystiscus pardus is a species of very small sea snail, a marine gastropod mollusk or micromollusk from the family Cystiscidae.

== Description ==
The shell of C. pardus is translucent, and white. The shells have been observed to grow up to 1.55 mm long and 1 mm wide. They can be identified by their flat spire, smooth inner shell lip, and three ridged plaits on their columellar fold.

The snail C. pardus has a bifurcated head and red eyes. The snail's foot has a cloudy patten of yellow and white. Its mantle is yellow with densely packed blue leopard spots which can be seen through the shell.

== Distribution ==
This species occurs in marine reefs off the north west coast of New Caledonia. It has been observed at two stations near the coast of Kuomac. It lives from depths between 15 and 20 m.
