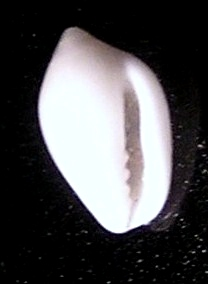
- Mesoginella turbinata

Scientific classification
- Kingdom: Animalia
- Phylum: Mollusca
- Class: Gastropoda
- Subclass: Caenogastropoda
- Order: Neogastropoda
- Family: Marginellidae
- Genus: Mesoginella; Laseron, 1957

Synonyms
- Deviginella Laseron, 1957; Sinuginella Laseron, 1957; Spiroginella Laseron, 1957

= Mesoginella =

Genus of gastropods

Mesoginella is a genus of sea snails, marine gastropod mollusks in the family Marginellidae, the margin snails.

== Species ==
According to the World Register of Marine Species (WoRMS), the following species are included within the genus Mesoginella :

- Mesoginella altilabra (May, 1911)
- Mesoginella aupouria (Powell, 1937)
- Mesoginella australis (Hinds, 1844)
- Mesoginella beecheyi (Cossignani, 2006)
- Mesoginella brachia (Watson, 1886)
- Mesoginella caducocincta (May, 1916)
- Mesoginella consobrina (May, 1911)
- Mesoginella cracens (Dell, 1956)
- Mesoginella ergastula (Dell, 1953)
- Mesoginella gabrieli (May, 1911)
- Mesoginella inconspicua (G.B. Sowerby, 1846)
- Mesoginella judithae (Dell, 1956)
- Mesoginella koma (Marshall, 2004)
- Mesoginella larochei (Powell, 1932)
- Mesoginella manawatawhia (Powell, 1937)
- Mesoginella modulata (Laseron, 1957)
- Mesoginella olivella (Reeve, 1865)
- Mesoginella otagoensis (Dell, 1956)
- Mesoginella pisinna (Marshall, 2004)
- Mesoginella punicea (Laseron, 1948)
- Mesoginella pygmaea (G.B. Sowerby, 1846)
- Mesoginella pygmaeiformis (Powell, 1937)
- Mesoginella pygmaeoides (Singleton, 1937)
- Mesoginella schoutanica (May, 1913)
- Mesoginella sinapi (Laseron, 1948)
- Mesoginella stilla (Hedley, 1903)
- Mesoginella strangei (Angas, 1877)
- Mesoginella tryphenensis (Powell, 1932)
- Mesoginella turbinata (G.B. Sowerby, II 1846)
- Mesoginella vailei (Powell, 1932)
- Mesoginella victoriae (Gatliff & Gabriel, 1908)

=== Species brought into synonymy ===
- Mesoginella binivitta (Laseron, 1948) : synonym of Mesoginella olivella (Reeve, 1865)
- Mesoginella evanida (G.B. Sowerby II, 1846) : synonym of Volvarina evanida (G.B. Sowerby II, 1846)
- Mesoginella frequens (Laseron, 1948) : synonym of Mesoginella strangei (Angas, 1877)
- Mesoginella gabrielae (Bozzetti, 1998) : synonym of Marginella gabrielae (Bozzetti, 1998)
- Mesoginella georgiana (May, 1915) : synonym of Austroginella georgiana (May, 1915)
- Mesoginella infelix (Jousseaume, 1857) : synonym of Mesoginella olivella (Reeve, 1865)
- Mesoginella maxilla (Laseron, 1957) : synonym of Mesoginella brachia (Watson, 1886)
- Mesoginella parsobrina (Laseron, 1948) : synonym of Mesoginella sinapi (Laseron, 1948)
- Mesoginella parvistriata (Suter, 1908) : synonym of Volvarina parvistriata (Suter, 1908)
- Mesoginella patria (Cotton, 1949) : synonym of Mesoginella inconspicua (G.B. Sowerby, 1846)
- Mesoginella pattisoni (Cotton, 1944) : synonym of Mesoginella turbinata (G.B. Sowerby II, 1846)
- Mesoginella pipire (Laseron, 1948) : synonym of Mesoginella strangei (Angas, 1877)
- Mesoginella plicatula (Suter, 1910) : synonym of Volvarina plicatula (Suter, 1910)
- Mesoginella praetermissa (May, 1916) : synonym of Austroginella praetermissa (May, 1916)
- Mesoginella procella (May, 1916) : synonym of Mesoginella olivella (Reeve, 1865)
- Mesoginella pusilla (Laseron, 1948) : synonym of Mesoginella turbinata (G.B. Sowerby II, 1846)
- Mesoginella simplex (Reeve, 1865) : synonym of Mesoginella olivella (Reeve, 1865)
- Mesoginella sinuata (Laseron, 1948) : synonym of Mesoginella strangei (Angas, 1877)
- Mesoginella translucida (G.B. Sowerby II, 1846) : synonym of Austroginella translucida (G.B. Sowerby II, 1846)
- Mesoginella tropica (Laseron, 1957) : synonym of Mesoginella brachia (Watson, 1886)
