= Mirpurina verdensis =

Scientific classification
- Kingdom: Animalia
- Phylum: Mollusca
- Class: Gastropoda
- Subclass: Caenogastropoda
- Order: Neogastropoda
- Family: Marginellidae
- Subfamily: Pruninae
- Genus: Mirpurina
- Species: M. verdensis

Binomial name
- Mirpurina verdensis (E.A. Smith, 1875)

Synonyms
- Marginella (Volvarina) verdensis E. A. Smith, 1875 (basionym); Volvarina (Atlantivolva) verdensis (E. A. Smith, 1875); Volvarina taeniata var. minor Jousseaume, 1877; Volvarina verdensis (E. A. Smith, 1875) ·

Species of gastropod

Mirpurina verdensis is a species of sea snail, a marine gastropod mollusk in the family Marginellidae, the margin snails.

== Description ==
The length of the shell attains 10½ mm, its diameter 5 mm.

(Original description in Latin) The elongate shell has a cylindrical-ovate shape. It is shiny, and, moderately thin. It is pale yellow (or whitish), banded with several brown (sometimes pinkish-red) oblique transverse lines. The shell consists of four whorls. The spire is very short, with convex edges. The aperture is narrow, slightly widened at the base, extending nearly to the entire length of the shell. The columella is convex above and shows four oblique plaits, the one on top smallest, the next a little larger, the third largest oblique, the last (which forms the base of the columella) joined by a somewhat smaller third. The outer lip is slightly compressed in the middle, the edge is curved, outside very thickened, and the ends of the bands well marked.

The bands are thus disposed: just below the suture there is a very broad one, which is sharply defined above but not so beneath, but gradually blends into the ground-colour of the shell. A little below this there are two narrow lines close together, then a single one round about the middle of the whorl, then two more approximated, which terminate at the base of the outer lip.

== Distribution ==
This species occurs in the Atlantic Ocean off Cape Verde
