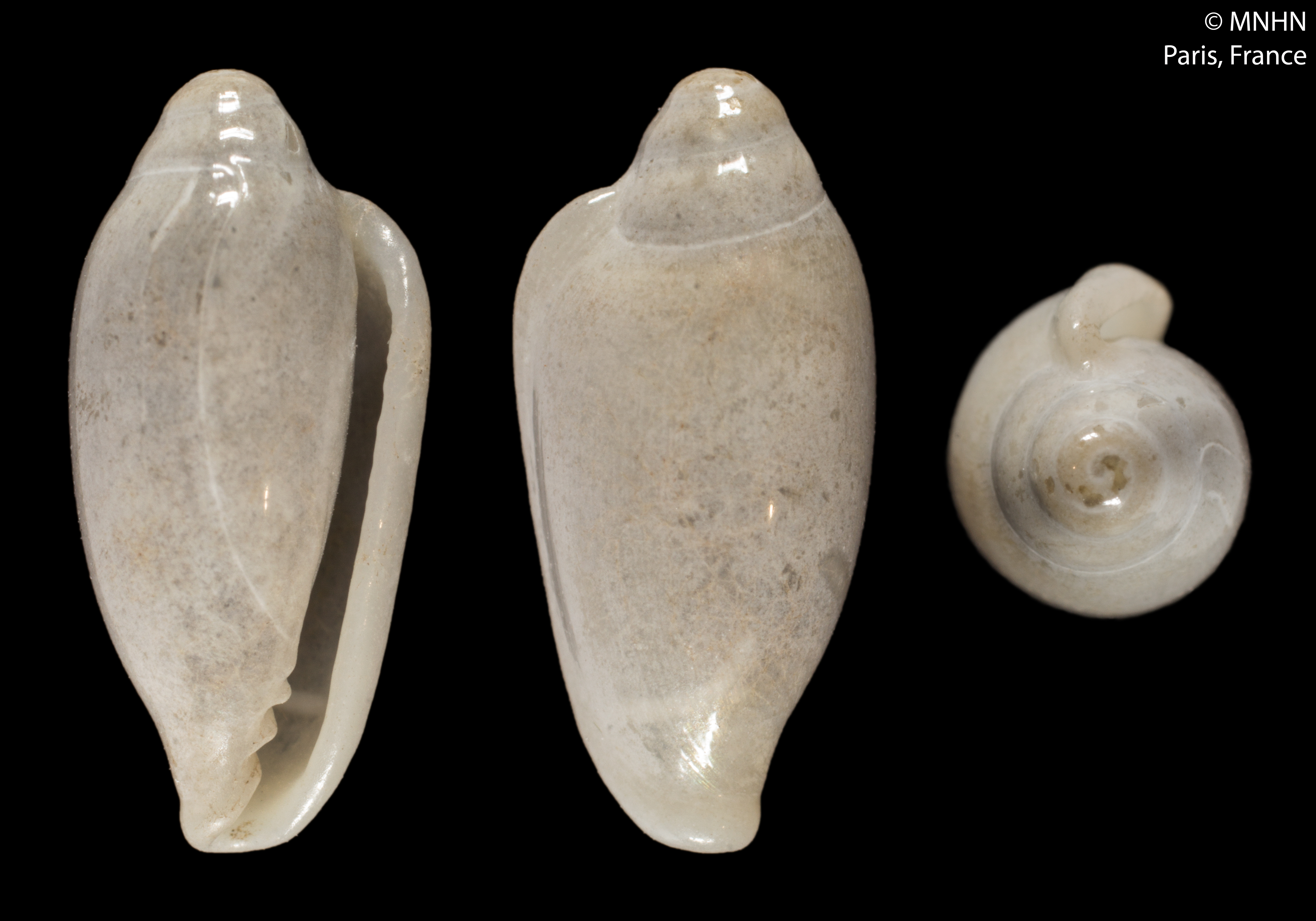
- Shell of Hydroginella dufresnei (holotype at MNHN, Paris)

Scientific classification
- Kingdom: Animalia
- Phylum: Mollusca
- Class: Gastropoda
- Subclass: Caenogastropoda
- Order: Neogastropoda
- Superfamily: Volutoidea
- Family: Marginellidae
- Subfamily: Austroginellinae; G. A. Coovert & H. K. Coovert, 1995

= Austroginellinae =

Subfamily of sea snails

Austroginellinae is a taxonomic subfamily within the larger family of Marginellidae, a group of small sea snails, marine gastropod molluscs in the superfamily Volutoidea.

== Genera ==
- Alaginella Laseron, 1957
- Austroginella Laseron, 1957
- † Conuginella Laseron, 1957
- Hydroginella Laseron, 1957
- Marigordiella Espinosa & Ortea, 2010
- Mesoginella Laseron, 1957
- † Mioginella Laseron, 1957
- Ovaginella Laseron, 1957
- Protoginella Laseron, 1957
- Pustinella Teso, F. Scarabino, Pacheco & Pastorino, 2025
- Serrata Jousseaume, 1875
- † Stromboginella Laseron, 1957

Genera brought into synonymy

- Carinaginella Laseron, 1957: synonym of Alaginella Laseron, 1957
- Cassoginella Laseron, 1957 †: synonym of Alaginella Laseron, 1957
- Deviginella Laseron, 1957: synonym of Mesoginella Laseron, 1957
- † Exiginella Laseron, 1957: synonym of Serrata Jousseaume, 1875 (junior subjective synonym)
- Haloginella Laseron, 1957: synonym of Serrata Jousseaume, 1875
- Neptoginella Laseron, 1957: synonym of Hydroginella Laseron, 1957
- Pillarginella Gabriel, 1962: synonym of Hydroginella Laseron, 1957
- Plicaginella Laseron, 1957: synonym of Austroginella Laseron, 1957
- Serrataginella G. A. Coovert & H. K. Coovert, 1995: synonym of Serrata Jousseaume, 1875
- Sinuginella Laseron, 1957: synonym of Mesoginella Laseron, 1957
- Spiroginella Laseron, 1957: synonym of Mesoginella Laseron, 1957
- Triginella Laseron, 1957: synonym of Alaginella Laseron, 1957
- † Urniginella Laseron, 1957: synonym of Mesoginella Laseron, 1957 (junior subjective synonym)
