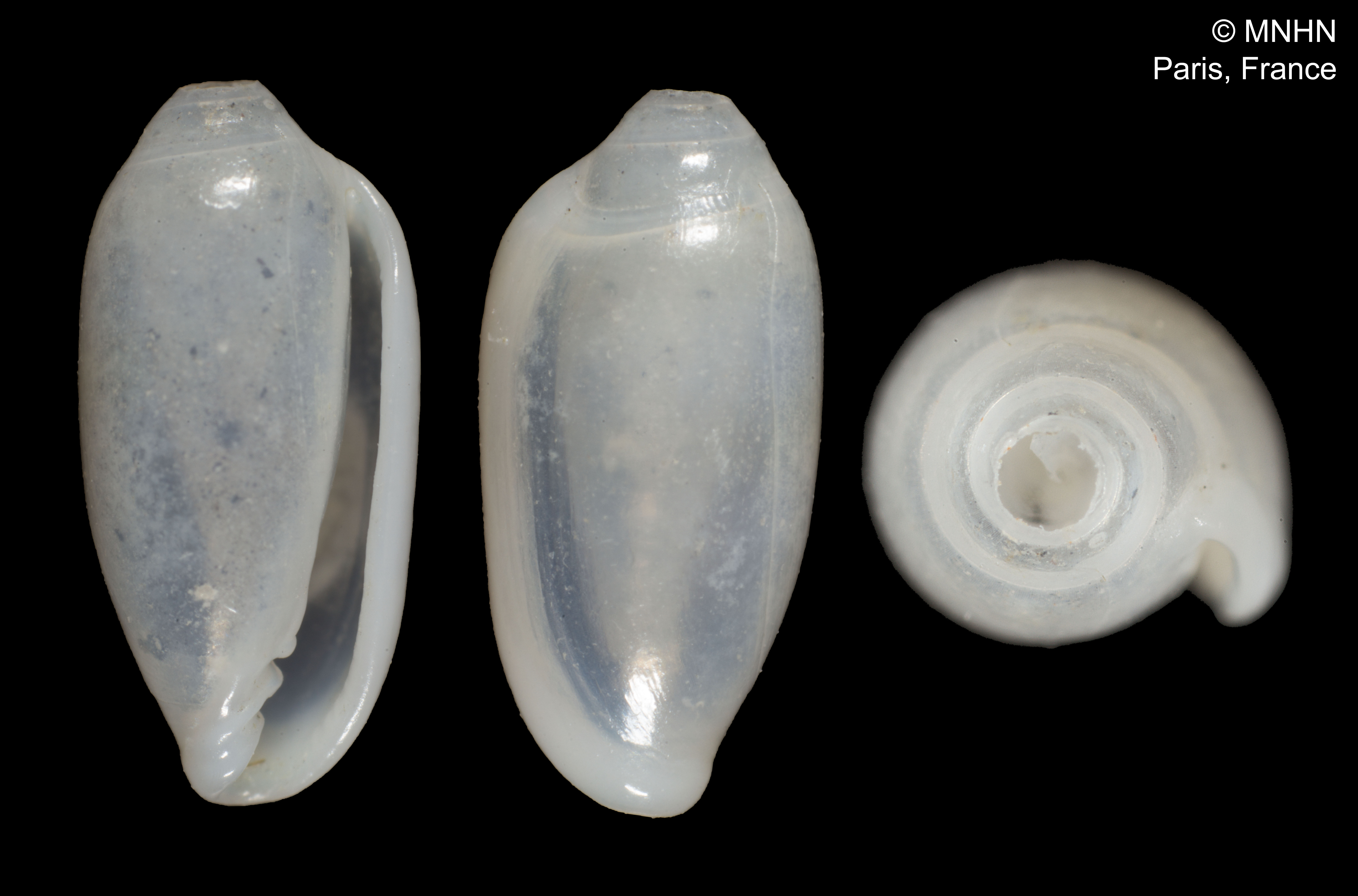
- Shell of Hydroginella scintilla (syntype at MNHN, Paris)

Scientific classification
- Kingdom: Animalia
- Phylum: Mollusca
- Class: Gastropoda
- Subclass: Caenogastropoda
- Order: Neogastropoda
- Family: Marginellidae
- Genus: Hydroginella
- Species: H. scintilla

Binomial name
- Hydroginella scintilla (Jousseaume, 1875)

Synonyms
- Hydroginella roselineae T. Cossignani, 2009; Serrata scintilla Jousseaume, 1875 (original combination)

= Hydroginella scintilla =

Species of gastropod

Hydroginella scintilla is a species of sea snail, a marine gastropod mollusk in the family Marginellidae, the margin snails.

== Distribution ==
This species occurs in the Indian Ocean off Mauritius.
