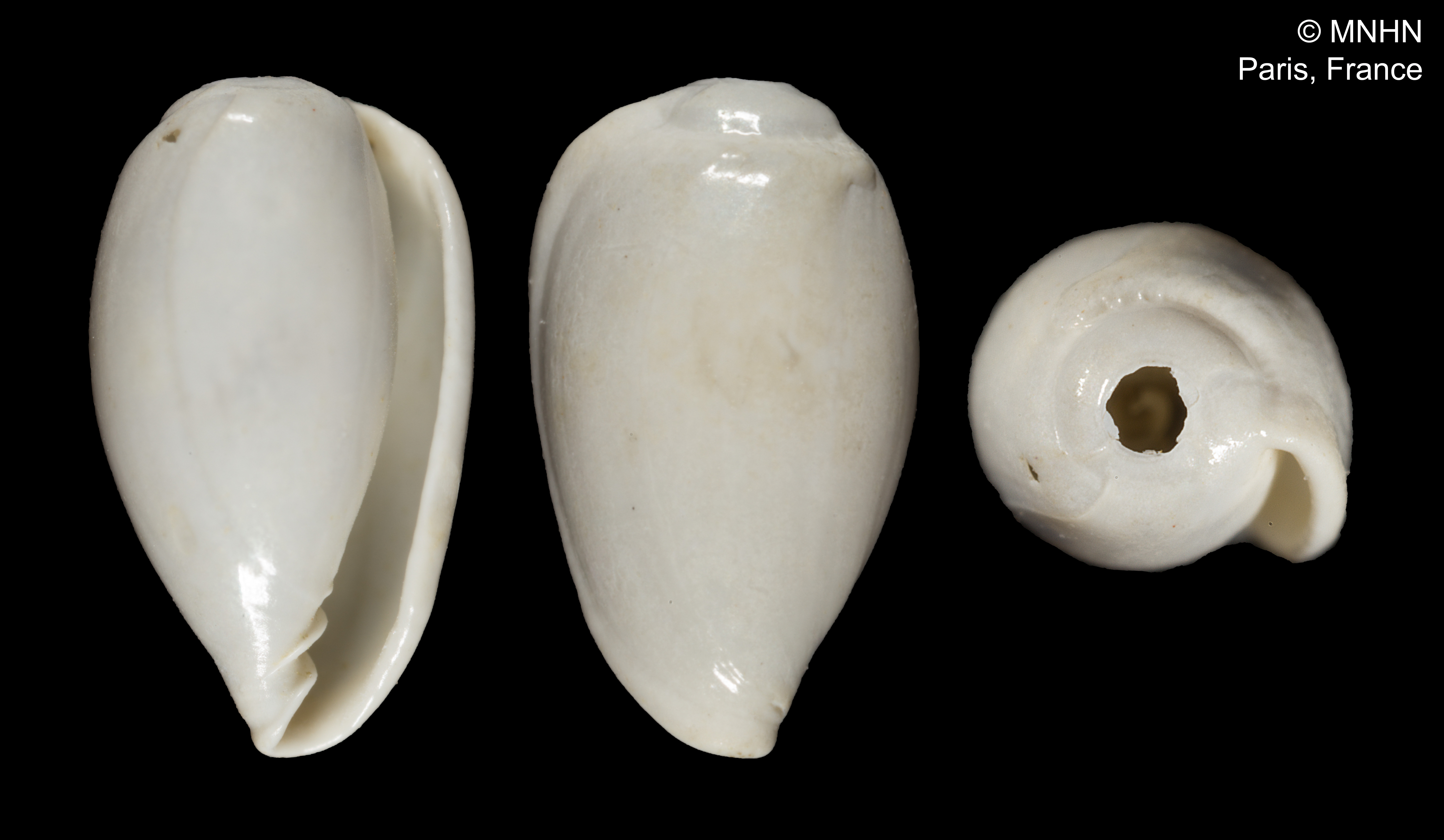
- Shell of Hydroginella bullata (holotype at MNHN, Paris)

Scientific classification
- Kingdom: Animalia
- Phylum: Mollusca
- Class: Gastropoda
- Subclass: Caenogastropoda
- Order: Neogastropoda
- Family: Marginellidae
- Genus: Hydroginella
- Species: H. bullata

Binomial name
- Hydroginella bullata Boyer, Wakefield & McCleery, 2003

= Hydroginella bullata =

Species of gastropod

Hydroginella bullata is a species of sea snail, a marine gastropod mollusc in the family Marginellidae, the margin snails.

== Description ==
The length of the shell attains 4.65 mm.

== Distribution ==
This species occurs off Fiji.
