= Hydroginella galatea =

Scientific classification
- Kingdom: Animalia
- Phylum: Mollusca
- Class: Gastropoda
- Subclass: Caenogastropoda
- Order: Neogastropoda
- Family: Marginellidae
- Genus: Hydroginella
- Species: H. galatea

Binomial name
- Hydroginella galatea Lussi & Smith, 1999

Species of gastropod

Hydroginella galatea is a species of sea snail, a marine gastropod mollusk in the family Marginellidae, the margin snails.
