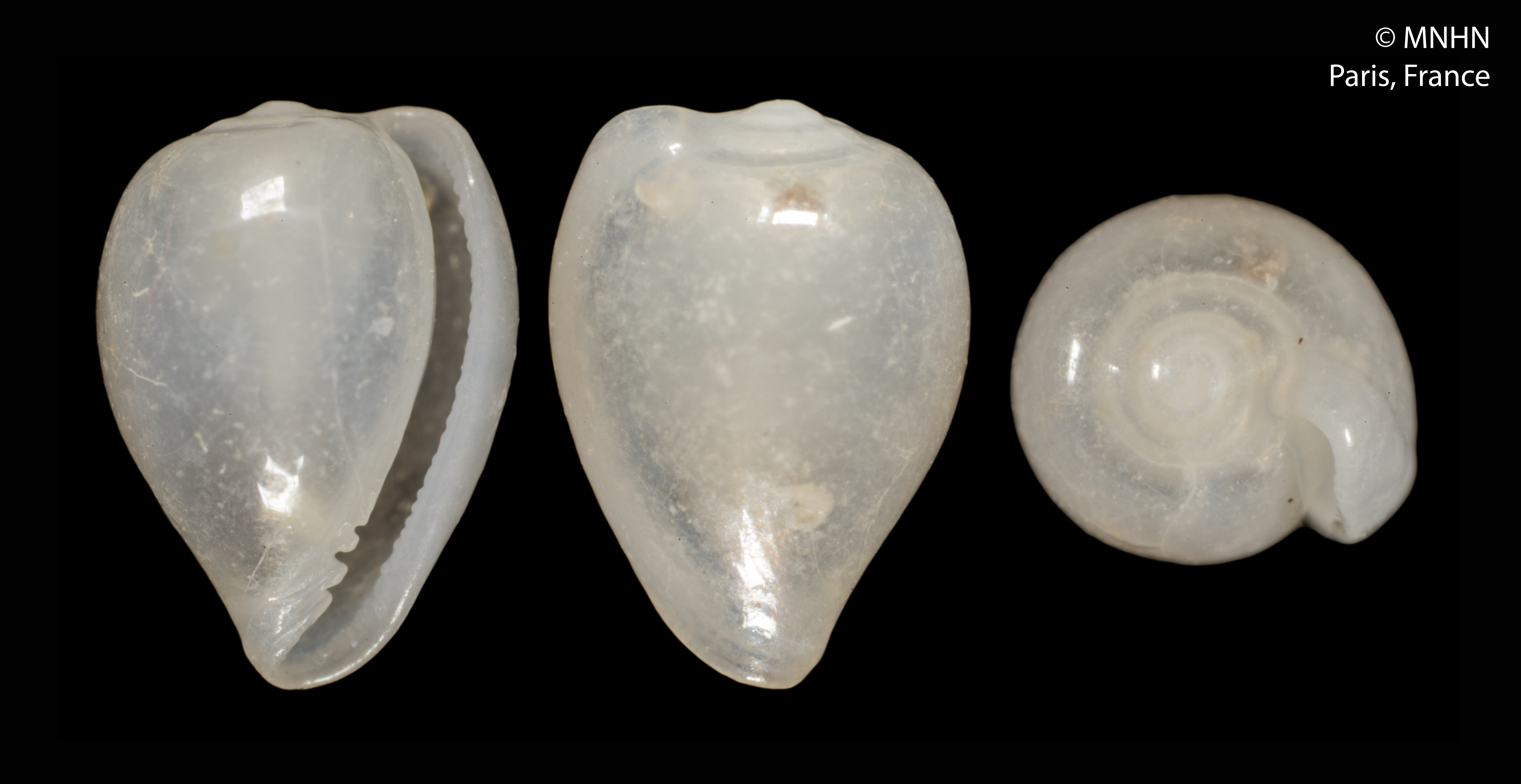
- Shell of Hydroginella marina (holotype at MNHN, Paris)

Scientific classification
- Kingdom: Animalia
- Phylum: Mollusca
- Class: Gastropoda
- Subclass: Caenogastropoda
- Order: Neogastropoda
- Family: Marginellidae
- Genus: Hydroginella
- Species: H. marina

Binomial name
- Hydroginella marina Lorenz & Kostin, 2007

= Hydroginella marina =

Species of gastropod

Hydroginella marina is a species of sea snail, a marine gastropod mollusk in the family Marginellidae, the margin snails.

== Description ==
The length of the shell attains 3.03 mm.

== Distribution ==
This marine species occurs off Papua New Guinea.
