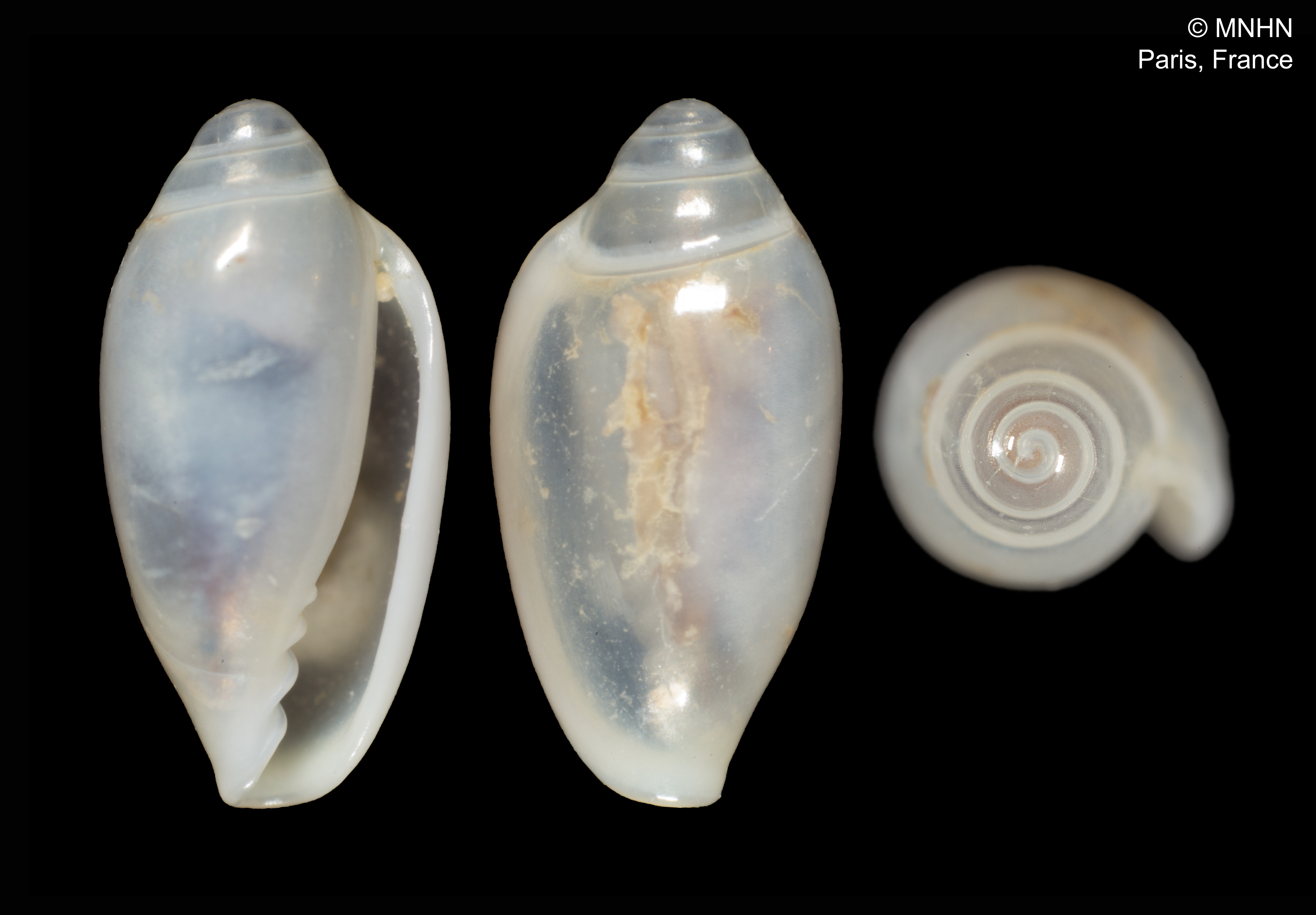
- Shell of Hydroginella gemella (holotype at MNHN, Paris)

Scientific classification
- Kingdom: Animalia
- Phylum: Mollusca
- Class: Gastropoda
- Subclass: Caenogastropoda
- Order: Neogastropoda
- Family: Marginellidae
- Genus: Hydroginella
- Species: H. gemella

Binomial name
- Hydroginella gemella Boyer, 2001

= Hydroginella gemella =

Species of gastropod

Hydroginella gemella is a species of sea snail, a marine gastropod mollusk in the family Marginellidae, the margin snails.

== Description ==
The shell of Hydroginella gemella is relatively small, with a length that can reach up to 4.7 mm. The aperture is narrow, and the outer lip is thin and slightly flared.

== Distribution ==
Hydroginella gemella is found in the marine waters off New Caledonia. The species inhabits shallow to moderately deep waters, typically at depths ranging from 10 to 50 meters.
