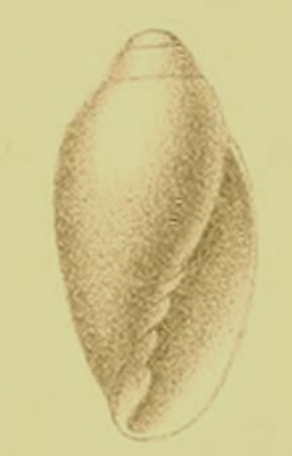
- A scientific illustration of Pustinella hyalina

Scientific classification
- Kingdom: Animalia
- Phylum: Mollusca
- Class: Gastropoda
- Subclass: Caenogastropoda
- Order: Neogastropoda
- Family: Marginellidae
- Subfamily: Austroginellinae
- Genus: Pustinella; Teso, F. Scarabino, Pacheco & Pastorino, 2025

Type species
- Pustinella cymatilis Teso, F. Scarabino, Pacheco & Pastorino, 2025

= Pustinella =

Genus of sea snails

Pustinella is a genus of sea snails that belong to the subfamily Austroginellinae of the family Marginellidae.

== Species ==
- Pustinella cymatilis Teso, F. Scarabino, Pacheco & Pastorino, 2025
- Pustinella ealesae A. W. B. Powell, 1958
- Pustinella felidamia Teso, F. Scarabino, Pacheco & Pastorino, 2025
- Pustinella hyalina Thiele, 1912
