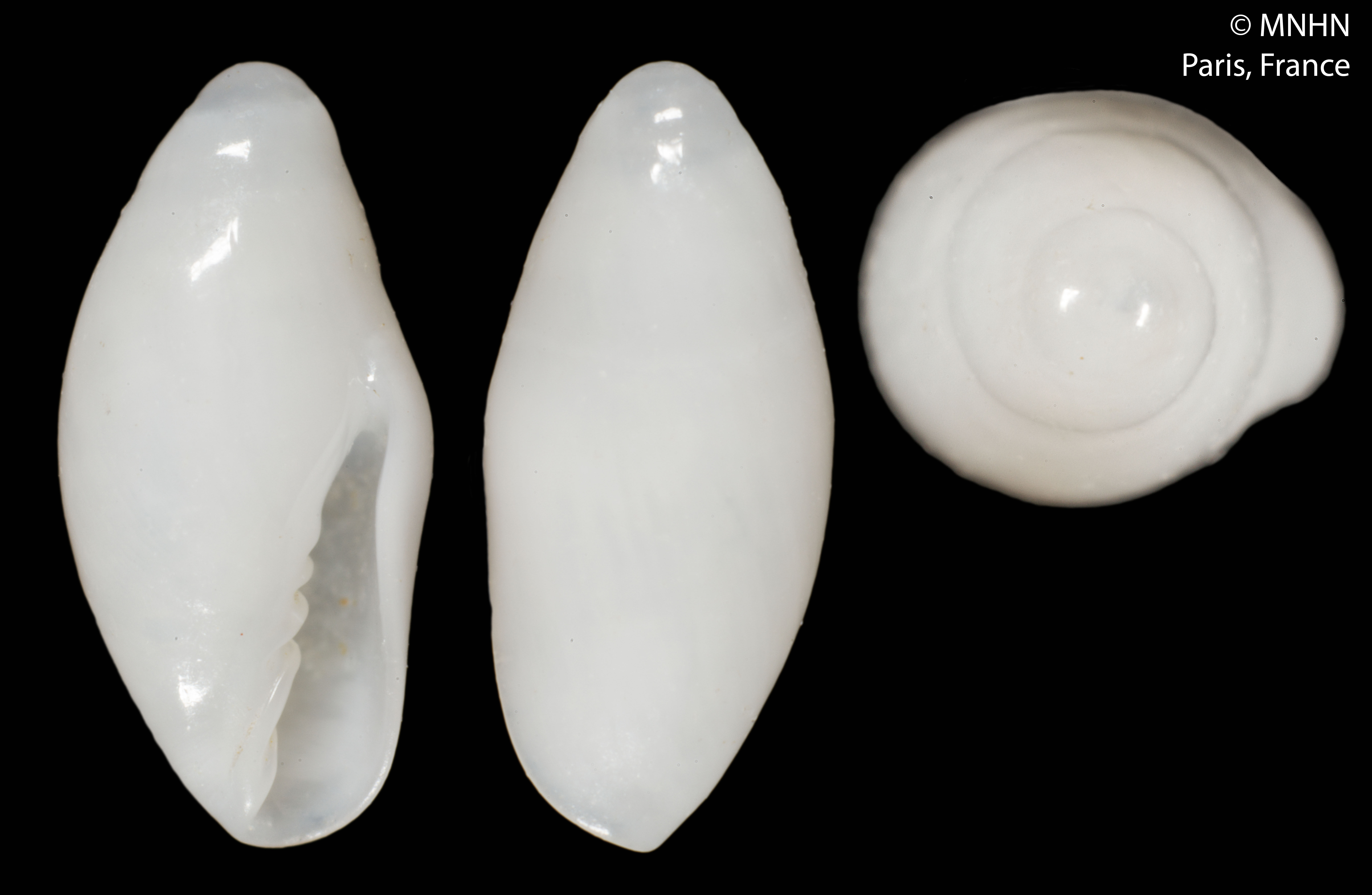
- Shell of Demissa nevilli (syntype at MNHN, Paris)

Scientific classification
- Kingdom: Animalia
- Phylum: Mollusca
- Class: Gastropoda
- Subclass: Caenogastropoda
- Order: Neogastropoda
- Family: Marginellidae
- Genus: Demissa
- Species: D. nevilli

Binomial name
- Demissa nevilli (Jousseaume, 1875)

Synonyms
- Dentimargo lantzi (Jousseaume, 1875); Marginella (Volvarina) inconspicua G. Nevill & H. Nevill, 1874; Marginella inconspicua G. Nevill & H. Nevill, 1874 (invalid: junior homonym of Marginella inconspicua G. B. Sowerby II, 1846; Marginella nevilli is a replacement name); Marginella lantzi Jousseaume, 1875; Marginella nevilli Jousseaume, 1875 (original combination); Volvarina inconspicua (G. Nevill & H. Nevill, 1874); Volvarina nevilli (Jousseaume, 1875)

= Demissa nevilli =

Species of gastropod

Demissa nevilli is a species of sea snail, a marine gastropod mollusk in the family Marginellidae, the margin snails.

== Distribution ==
This marine species occurs off Madagascar and Réunion.
