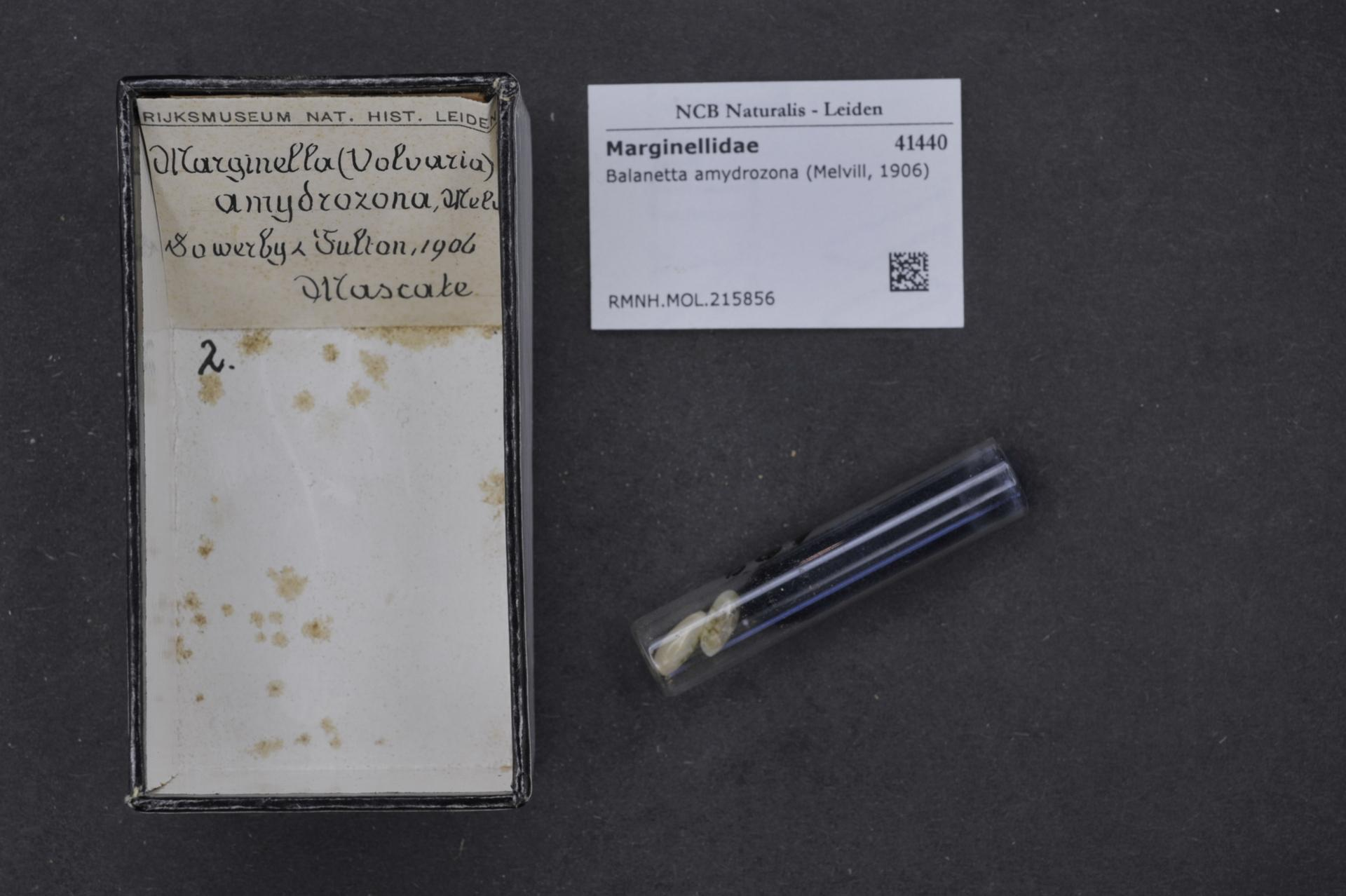

Scientific classification
- Kingdom: Animalia
- Phylum: Mollusca
- Class: Gastropoda
- Subclass: Caenogastropoda
- Order: Neogastropoda
- Family: Marginellidae
- Genus: Balanetta
- Species: B. amydrozona

Binomial name
- Balanetta amydrozona (Melvill, 1906)

Synonyms
- Marginella amydrozona Melvill; Volvarina amydrozona Melvill, 1906 (basionym)

= Balanetta amydrozona =

Species of gastropod

Balanetta amydrozona is a species of sea snail, a marine gastropod mollusc in the family Marginellidae, the margin snails.

== Distribution ==
This species is distributed in the Gulf of Oman and in the Indian Ocean along Madagascar.
