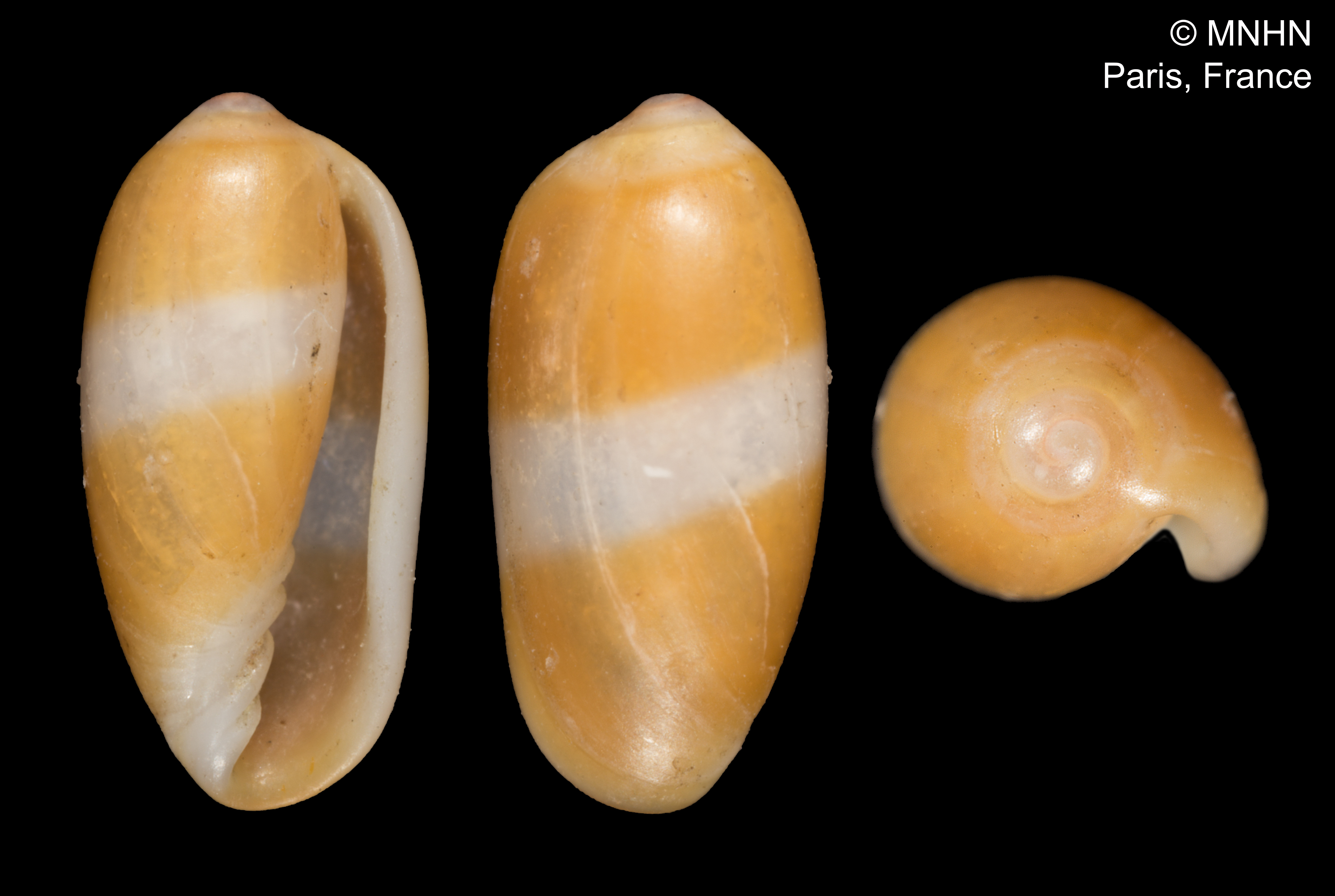
- Shell of Mirpurina mediocincta (syntype at MNHN, Paris)

Scientific classification
- Kingdom: Animalia
- Phylum: Mollusca
- Class: Gastropoda
- Subclass: Caenogastropoda
- Order: Neogastropoda
- Family: Marginellidae
- Genus: Mirpurina
- Species: M. mediocincta

Binomial name
- Mirpurina mediocincta (E A. Smith, 1875)

Synonyms
- Marginella (Volvarina) mediocincta E. A. Smith, 1875 (basionym); Volvarina bouvieri Jousseaume, 1877; Volvarina mediocincta (E. A. Smith, 1875)

= Mirpurina mediocincta =

Species of gastropod

Mirpurina mediocincta is a species of sea snail, a marine gastropod mollusc in the family Marginellidae, the margin snails.

== Distribution ==
This marine species occurs off the Cape Verdes.
