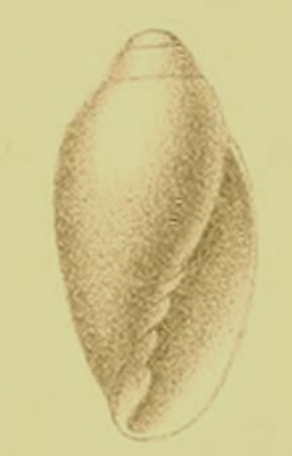
- Illustration of a shell of Pustinella hyalina

Scientific classification
- Kingdom: Animalia
- Phylum: Mollusca
- Class: Gastropoda
- Subclass: Caenogastropoda
- Order: Neogastropoda
- Family: Marginellidae
- Genus: Pustinella
- Species: P. hyalina

Binomial name
- Pustinella hyalina (Thiele, 1912)

Synonyms
- Hyalina hyalina (Thiele, 1912); Marginella hyalina (Thiele, 1912) superseded combination; Volvarina hyalina (Thiele, 1912) superseded combination

= Pustinella hyalina =

Species of sea snail

Pustinella hyalina is a species of sea snail, a marine gastropod mollusc in the family Marginellidae, the margin snails.

== Etymology ==
The specific name "hyalina" roots from the word "hyaline", which means "made of glass; transparent". the specific name is likely referring to the shell's glassy texture.

== Description ==
The shell size varies between 4.5mm and 8mm. This sea snail was discovered during the German South Polar Expedition.

== Distribution ==
This species is found in the cold waters along the South Shetlands, Weddell Sea and South America. It is found in the demersal range of 229–673 m of depth and the holotype is found in the polar coordinates of 63°S - 76°S, 180°E - 8°E.
