= Mesoginella koma =

Scientific classification
- Kingdom: Animalia
- Phylum: Mollusca
- Class: Gastropoda
- Subclass: Caenogastropoda
- Order: Neogastropoda
- Family: Marginellidae
- Genus: Mesoginella
- Species: M. koma

Binomial name
- Mesoginella koma Marshall, 2004

Species of gastropod

Mesoginella koma is a species of sea snail, a marine gastropod mollusk in the family Marginellidae, the margin snails. They are found in the waters around New Zealand.
