= Mesoginella beecheyi =

Scientific classification
- Kingdom: Animalia
- Phylum: Mollusca
- Class: Gastropoda
- Subclass: Caenogastropoda
- Order: Neogastropoda
- Family: Marginellidae
- Genus: Mesoginella
- Species: M. beecheyi

Binomial name
- Mesoginella beecheyi Cossignani, 2006

Species of gastropod

Mesoginella beecheyi is a species of sea snail, a marine gastropod mollusk in the family Marginellidae, the margin snails.
