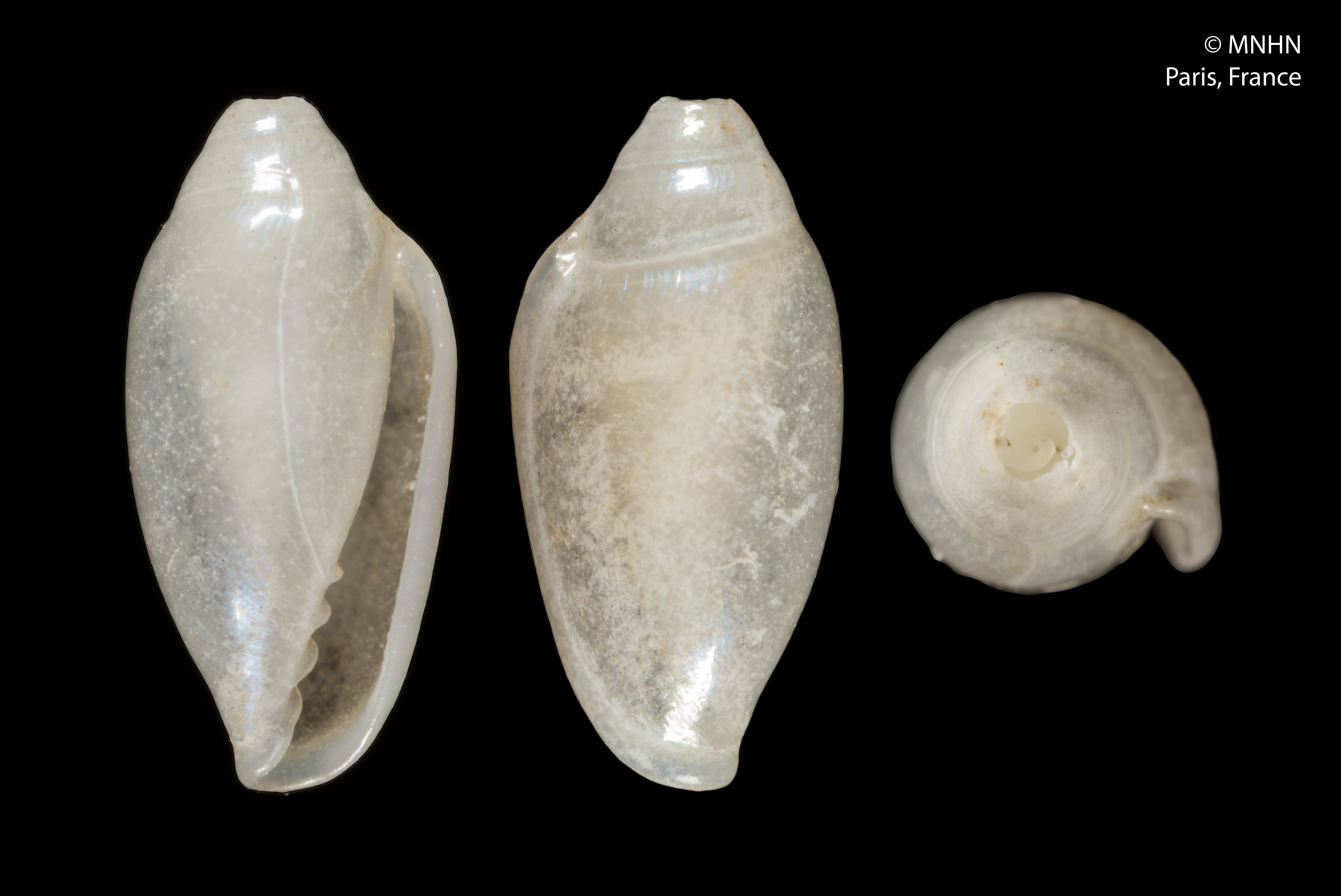
- Shell of Hydroginella wareni (holotype at MNHN, Paris)

Scientific classification
- Kingdom: Animalia
- Phylum: Mollusca
- Class: Gastropoda
- Subclass: Caenogastropoda
- Order: Neogastropoda
- Family: Marginellidae
- Genus: Hydroginella
- Species: H. wareni

Binomial name
- Hydroginella wareni Boyer, Wakefield & McCleery, 2003

= Hydroginella wareni =

Species of gastropod

Hydroginella wareni is a species of minute sea snail, a marine gastropod mollusc or micromollusc in the family Marginellidae, the margin snails.

== Description ==
The length of the shell attains 5.9 mm.

== Distribution ==
This marine species occurs off Fiji.
