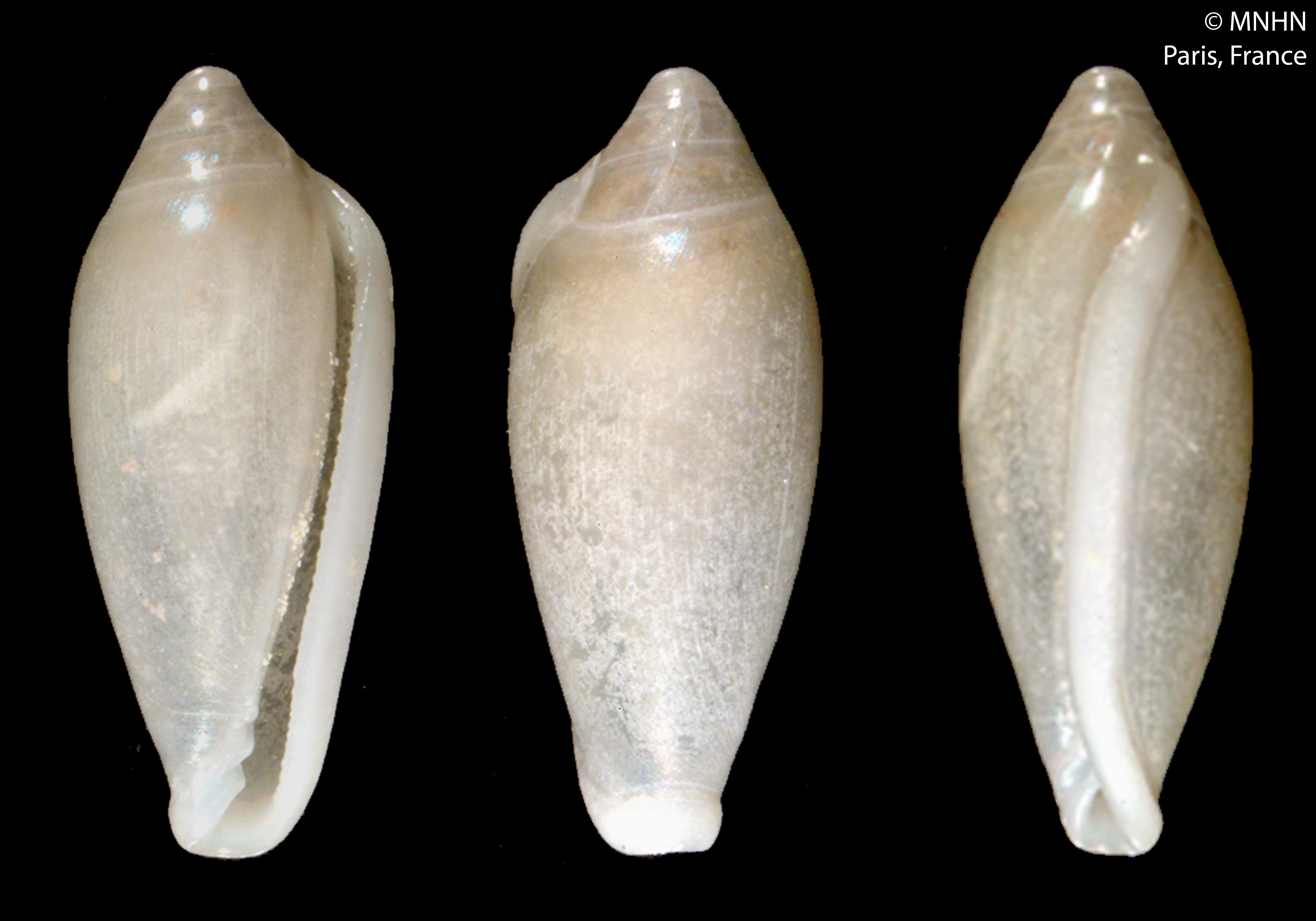
- Shell of Hydroginella angustata (holotype at MNHN, Paris)

Scientific classification
- Kingdom: Animalia
- Phylum: Mollusca
- Class: Gastropoda
- Subclass: Caenogastropoda
- Order: Neogastropoda
- Family: Marginellidae
- Genus: Hydroginella
- Species: H. angustata

Binomial name
- Hydroginella angustata Boyer, Wakefield & McCleery, 2003

= Hydroginella angustata =

Species of gastropod

Hydroginella angustata is a species of sea snail, a marine gastropod mollusk in the family Marginellidae, the margin snails.

== Description ==
The length of the shell attains 9 mm to 9.2 mm and is a uniform opaque pale cream. It has a smooth and glossy surface it is very narrow and tapers towards the base and is not shouldered. The spire is elevated to a moderate extent and it smooth sided and slightly blunt. It forms 25% of the shell length. The aperture is four fifths(4/5) of the total length of the shell with parallel sides and is very long and narrow. Its labrum is mostly straingh except for being slightly inflexed at the basal(lower) third. There are no internal lirae and about 40 minute denticles(small tooth-like or bristle-like structure).

== Distribution ==
This marine species occurs off the coast of Fiji.
