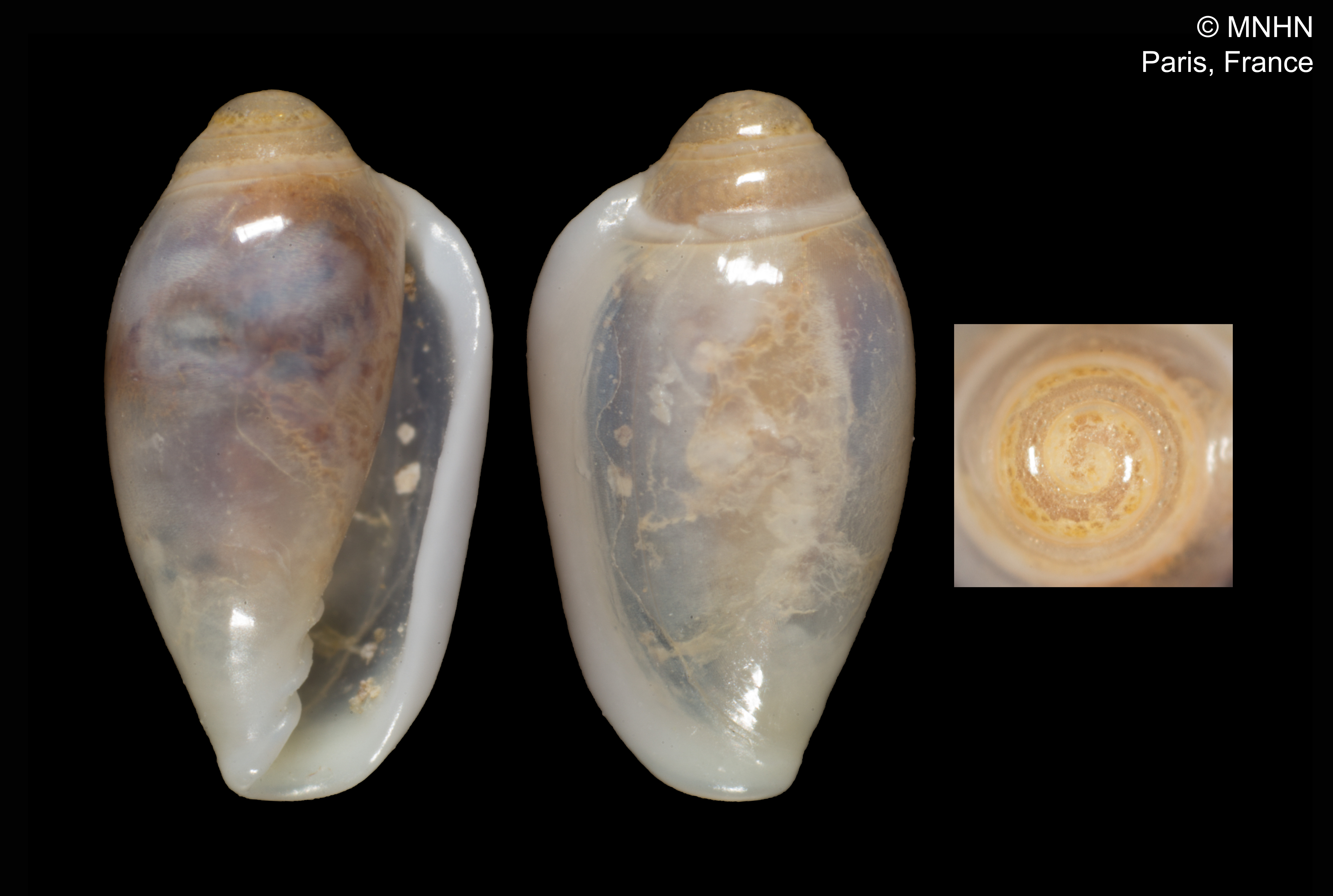
- Shell of Hydroginella richeri (holotype at MNHN, Paris)

Scientific classification
- Kingdom: Animalia
- Phylum: Mollusca
- Class: Gastropoda
- Subclass: Caenogastropoda
- Order: Neogastropoda
- Family: Marginellidae
- Genus: Hydroginella
- Species: H. richeri

Binomial name
- Hydroginella richeri Boyer, 2001

= Hydroginella richeri =

Species of gastropod

Hydroginella richeri is a species of sea snail, a marine gastropod mollusk in the family Marginellidae, the margin snails.

== Description ==
The length of the shell attains 4.35 mm.

== Distribution ==
This marine species occurs off New Caledonia.
