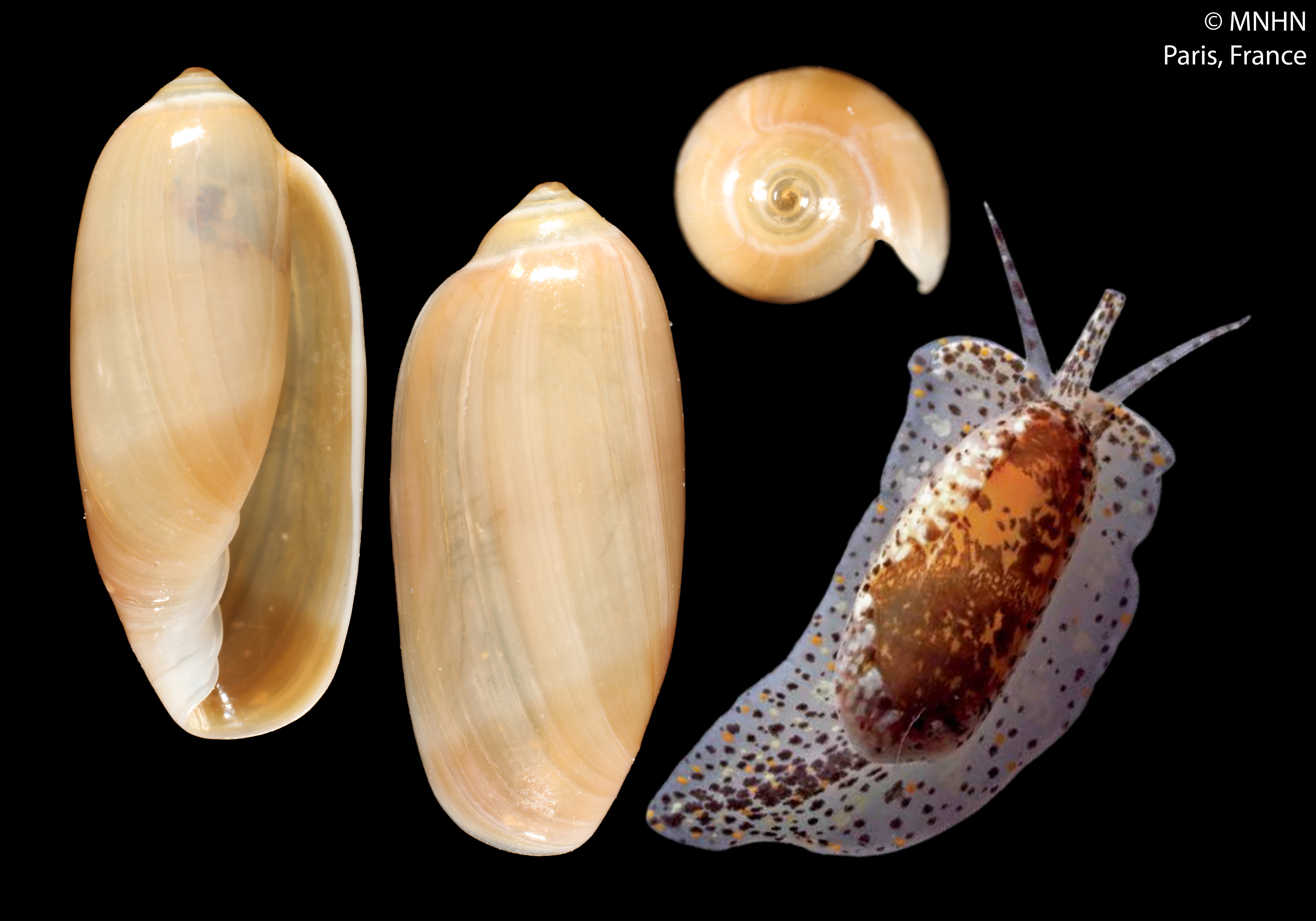
- Shell and animal of Hyalina buskei (holotype at MNHN, Paris)

Scientific classification
- Kingdom: Animalia
- Phylum: Mollusca
- Class: Gastropoda
- Subclass: Caenogastropoda
- Order: Neogastropoda
- Superfamily: Volutoidea
- Family: Marginellidae
- Subfamily: Pruninae; G. A. Coovert & H. K. Coovert, 1995

= Pruninae =

Subfamily of sea snails

Pruninae is a taxonomic subfamily within the larger family of Marginellidae, a group of small sea snails, marine gastropod molluscs in the superfamily Volutoidea.

== Genera ==
- Balanetta Jousseaume, 1875
- Bullata Jousseaume, 1875
- Closia Gray, 1857
- Cryptospira Hinds, 1844
- Hyalina Schumacher, 1817
- Mirpurina Ortea, Moro & Espinosa, 2019
- Prunum Herrmannsen, 1852
- Rivomarginella Brandt, 1968

Genera brought into synonymy

- Egouana: synonym of Egouena Jousseaume, 1875: synonym of Prunum Herrmannsen, 1852 (invalid: incorrect alternative original spelling)
- Egouena Jousseaume, 1875: synonym of Prunum Herrmannsen, 1852
- Gibberulina Monterosato, 1884: synonym of Bullata Jousseaume, 1875
- Leptegouana Woodring, 1928: synonym of Prunum Herrmannsen, 1852
- Porcellanella Conrad, 1863 †: synonym of Prunum Herrmannsen, 1852 ( invalid: junior homonym of Porcellanella White, 1852 [Crustacea].)
- Volutella Swainson, 1831: synonym of Bullata Jousseaume, 1875 (invalid: junior homonym of Volutella Perry, 1810 [Vasidae])
