= Ovaginella decaryi =

Scientific classification
- Kingdom: Animalia
- Phylum: Mollusca
- Class: Gastropoda
- Subclass: Caenogastropoda
- Order: Neogastropoda
- Family: Marginellidae
- Genus: Ovaginella
- Species: O. decaryi

Binomial name
- Ovaginella decaryi (Bavay, 1920)

Synonyms
- Marginella (Volvaria) decaryi Bavay, 1920; Marginella decaryi Bavay, 1920

Species of gastropod

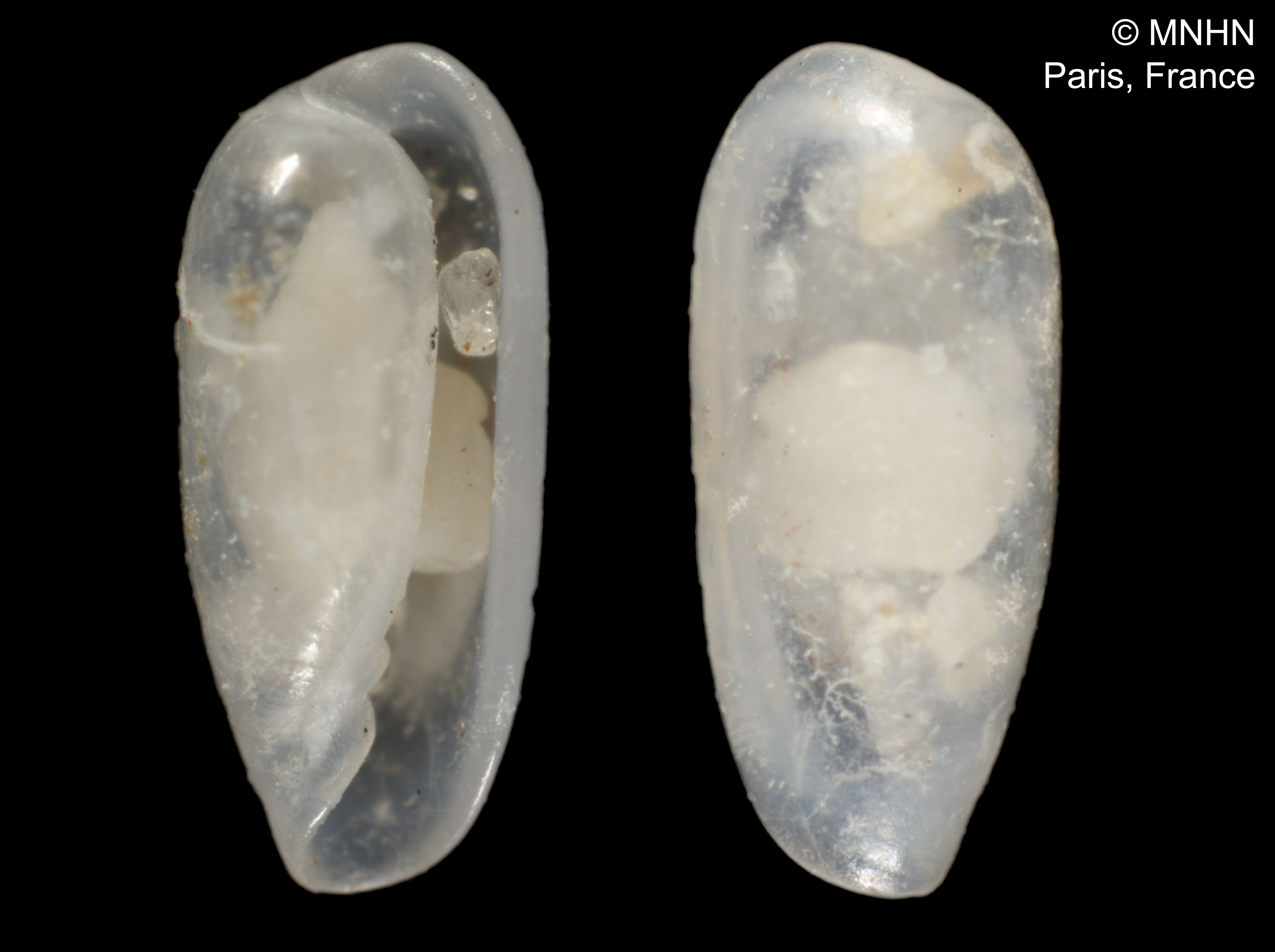
Preserved specimen of Ovaginella decaryi

Ovaginella decaryi is a species of sea snail, a marine gastropod mollusk in the family Marginellidae, the margin snails.
