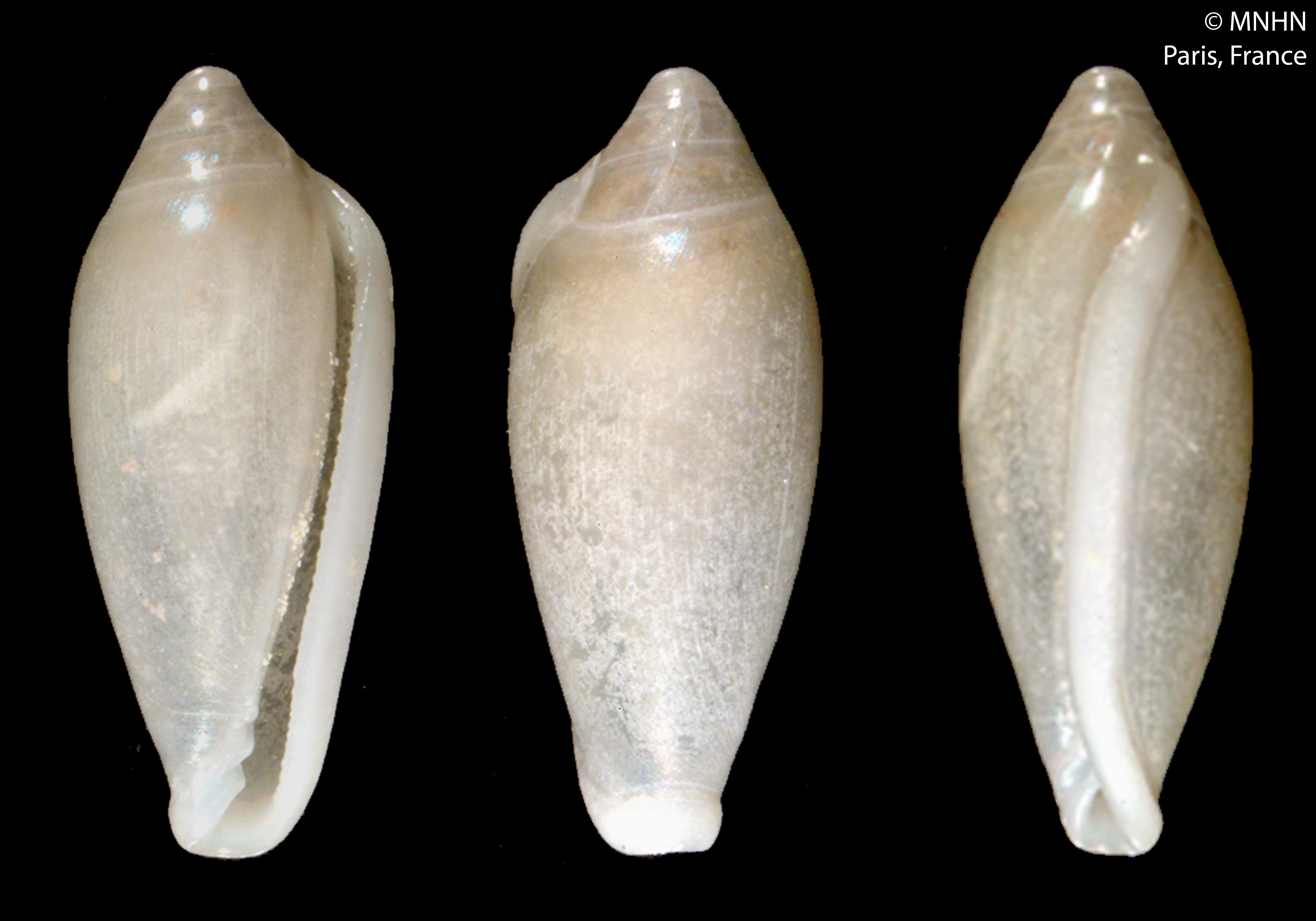
- Shell of Hydroginella angustata (holotype at MNHN, Paris)

Scientific classification
- Kingdom: Animalia
- Phylum: Mollusca
- Class: Gastropoda
- Subclass: Caenogastropoda
- Order: Neogastropoda
- Superfamily: Volutoidea
- Family: Marginellidae
- Genus: Hydroginella; Laseron, 1957

Type species
- Hydroginella dispersa Laseron, 1957

Synonyms
- Neptoginella Laseron, 1957; Pillarginella Gabriel, 1962

= Hydroginella =

Genus of gastropods

Hydroginella is a genus of marginellid minute sea snails, marine gastropod mollusks in the subfamily Austroginellinae of the family Marginellidae, the margin snails.

Hydroginella caledonica (Jousseaume, 1876) can parasitize sleeping fishes of the families Scaridae, Serranidae and Pomacentridae at coral reefs in New Caledonia by night. This snail is able to inserts its proboscis in the fish flesh and probably pumps some body fluids.

== Species ==
Species within the genus Hydroginella include:

- Hydroginella agulhasensis (Thiele, 1925)
- Hydroginella angustata Boyer, Wakefield & McCleery, 2003
- Hydroginella bullata Boyer, Wakefield & McCleery, 2003
- Hydroginella caledonica (Jousseaume, 1877)
- Hydroginella chiapponii T. Cossignani & Lorenz, 2021
- Hydroginella columnaria (Hedley & May, 1908)
- Hydroginella cypraeaformis Boyer, 2015
- Hydroginella dedicata Boyer, 2018
- Hydroginella delessertiana (Récluz, 1841)
- Hydroginella dispersa Laseron, 1957
- Hydroginella dufresnei Boyer, 2015
- Hydroginella fascicula (Laseron, 1957)
- Hydroginella galatea Lussi & Smith, 1999
- Hydroginella gemella Boyer, 2001
- Hydroginella guttula (G. B. Sowerby I, 1832)
- Hydroginella limata (Ma, 1994)
- Hydroginella marina Lorenz & Kostin, 2007
- Hydroginella marionae Boyer, 2015
- Hydroginella mixta (Petterd, 1884)
- Hydroginella musorstomi Boyer, Wakefield & McCleery, 2003
- Hydroginella osteri (Jousseaume, 1875)
- Hydroginella richeri Boyer, 2001
- Hydroginella rugosa Boyer, Wakefield & McCleery, 2003
- Hydroginella scintilla (Jousseaume, 1875)
- Hydroginella sordida (Reeve, 1865)
- Hydroginella sterbai T. Cossignani & Lorenz, 2021
- Hydroginella superstes (Laseron, 1957)
- Hydroginella tridentata (Tate, 1878)
- Hydroginella unica Boyer, Wakefield & McCleery, 2003
- Hydroginella vincentiana (Cotton, 1944)
- Hydroginella vitiensis Boyer, Wakefield & McCleery, 2003
- Hydroginella wareni Boyer, Wakefield & McCleery, 2003

Species brought into synonymy

- Hydroginella dawnbrinkae Massier, 1993: synonym of Hydroginella agulhasensis (Thiele, 1925)
- Hydroginella electrina (G. B. Sowerby III, 1892): synonym of Hyalina electrina (G. B. Sowerby III, 1892)
- Hydroginella roselineae Cossignani, 2009: synonym of Hydroginella scintilla (Jousseaume, 1875)
- Hydroginella tropica Laseron, 1957: synonym of Dentimargo tropicus (Laseron, 1957)
- Hydroginella tuii Cossignani, 2001: synonym of Serrata tuii (T. Cossignani, 2001) (original combination)
