= Volvarina plicatula =

Scientific classification
- Kingdom: Animalia
- Phylum: Mollusca
- Class: Gastropoda
- Subclass: Caenogastropoda
- Order: Neogastropoda
- Family: Marginellidae
- Subfamily: Marginellinae
- Genus: Volvarina
- Species: V. plicatula

Binomial name
- Volvarina plicatula (Suter, 1909)

Synonyms
- Haloginella plicatula (Suter, 1909); Marginella (Glabella) plicatula Suter, 1909 (basionym); Mesoginella plicatula (Suter, 1909); Serrata plicatula (Suter, 1909)

Species of gastropod

Volvarina plicatula is a species of sea snail, a marine gastropod mollusk in the family Marginellidae, the margin snails.

== Description ==
The length of the shell attains 3 mm, its diameter 1.7 mm.

== Distribution ==
This marine species is endemic to New Zealand and occurs off the Auckland Islands.
