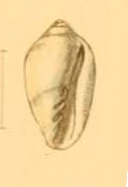
- Drawing of a shell of Volvarina evanida (holotype)

Scientific classification
- Kingdom: Animalia
- Phylum: Mollusca
- Class: Gastropoda
- Subclass: Caenogastropoda
- Order: Neogastropoda
- Family: Marginellidae
- Subfamily: Marginellinae
- Genus: Volvarina
- Species: V. evanida

Binomial name
- Volvarina evanida (G.B. Sowerby II, 1846)

Synonyms
- Marginella evanida G. B. Sowerby II, 1846 (original combination); Mesoginella evanida (G. B. Sowerby II, 1846); Sinuginella evanida (G. B. Sowerby II, 1846)

= Volvarina evanida =

Species of gastropod

Volvarina evanida, common name the alabaster marginella. is a species of sea snail, a marine gastropod mollusk in the family Marginellidae, the margin snails.

== Description ==
The small, white shell is elongate and has an oval shape. The spire is short. The outer lip is thick and incrassate. It is bent inwards so as to narrow the aperture. The last two of the four plaits on the columella are close together and tumid.
