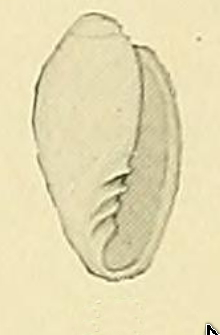
- Drawing of a shell of Volvarina parvistriata (holotype)

Scientific classification
- Kingdom: Animalia
- Phylum: Mollusca
- Class: Gastropoda
- Subclass: Caenogastropoda
- Order: Neogastropoda
- Family: Marginellidae
- Subfamily: Marginellinae
- Genus: Volvarina
- Species: V. parvistriata

Binomial name
- Volvarina parvistriata (Suter, 1908)

Synonyms
- Haloginella parvistriata (Suter, 1908); Marginella (Glabella) parvistriata Suter, 1908 (original combination); Mesoginella parvistriata (Suter, 1908); Serrata parvistiatra (Suter, 1908)

= Volvarina parvistriata =

Species of gastropod

Volvarina parvistriata is a species of sea snail, a marine gastropod mollusk in the family Marginellidae, the margin snails.

== Description ==
The length of the shell attains 3.1 mm, its diameter 1.7 mm.

(Original description) The very small shell is oviform, semitransparent. It has a short spire, axially finely striated. The sculpture consists of minute, close, and straight axial striae, continuous over the spire to the body whorl. The colour of the shell is white or yellowish white. The spire is short, conoidal and with a blunt apex, its height about one- fifth that of the aperture. The protoconch is smooth, andbroadly convex. The shell contains three whorls, flat on the spire. The body whorl is high, moderately convex and slightly narrowed towards the base. The sutnre is indistinct. The aperture is high and narrow, a little wider below, subchannelled above and roundly truncated at the base. The outer lip is slightly convex, vertical, a little retrocurrent toward the suture, thickened and rounded. It is smooth inside, with an outer varix extending a short way up the spire and across the basal margin. The columella is a little oblique and has four oblique, nearly equidistant, strong plaits. The inner lip is broad and thin, distinct only outside the columella. The parietal wall is lightly convex.

== Distribution ==
This marine species occurs off New Zealand.

== Bibliography ==
- Cossignani, T. (2006). Marginellidae & Cystiscidae of the World. L'Informatore Piceno. 408 pp
