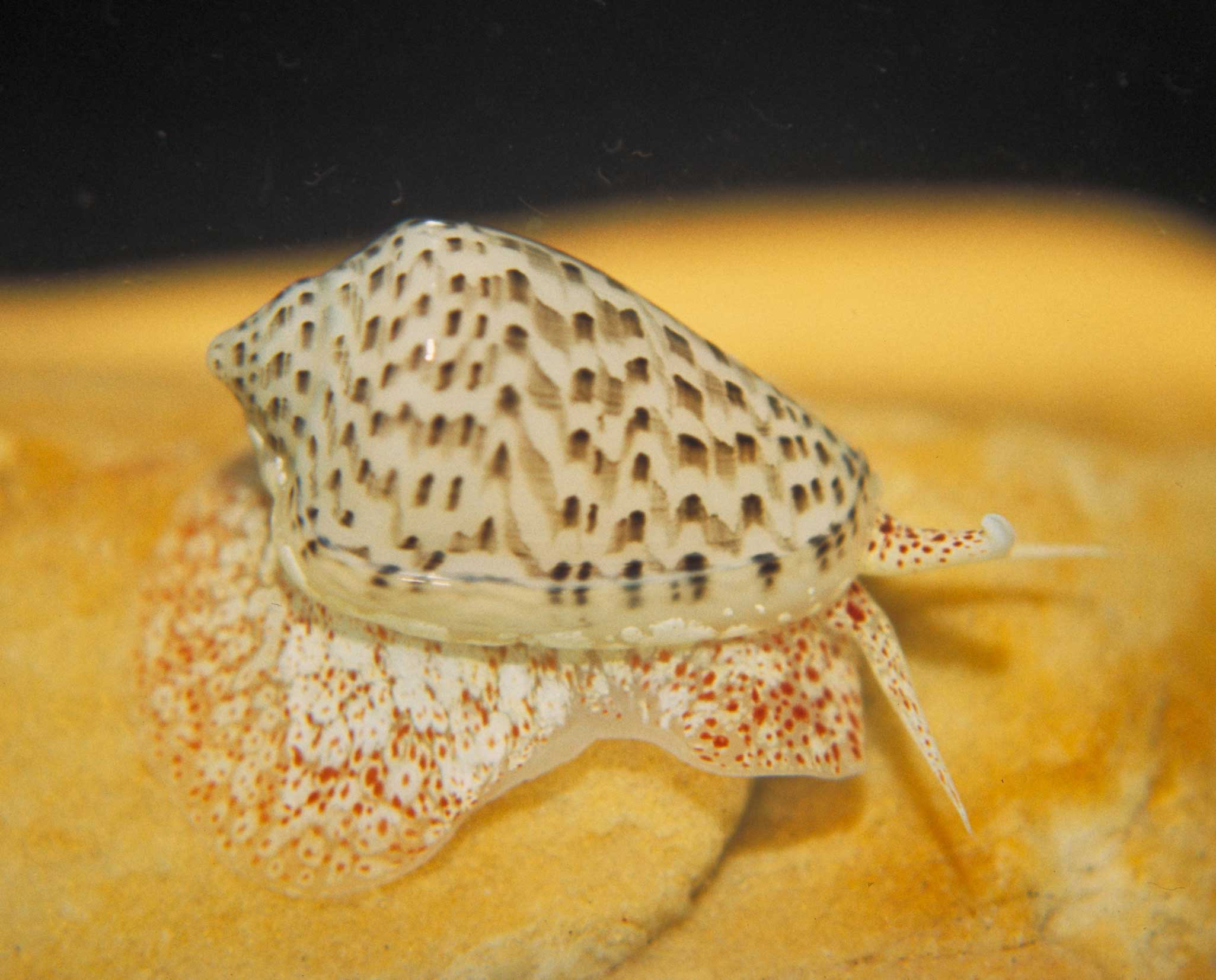
- A live individual of Marginella mosaica

Scientific classification
- Kingdom: Animalia
- Phylum: Mollusca
- Class: Gastropoda
- Subclass: Caenogastropoda
- Order: Neogastropoda
- Family: Marginellidae
- Genus: Marginella
- Species: M. mosaica

Binomial name
- Marginella mosaica Sowerby II, 1846

Synonyms
- Marginella langleyi Sowerby III, 1892

= Marginella mosaica =

Species of gastropod

Marginella mosaica, commonly known as the mosaic marginella, is a species of small sea snail, a marine gastropod mollusk in the family Marginellidae.
