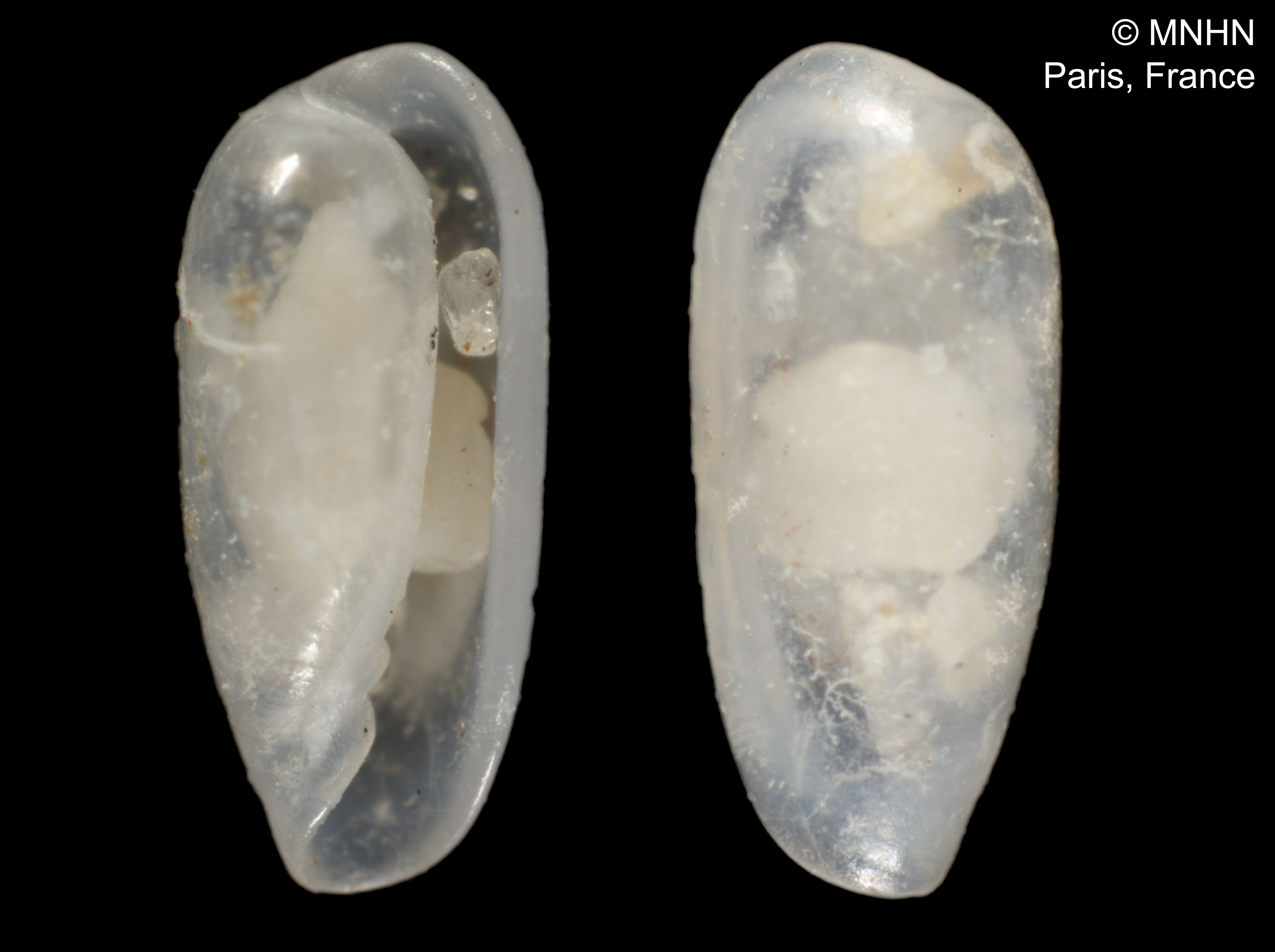
- Shell of Ovaginella decaryi (syntype at MNHN, Paris)

Scientific classification
- Kingdom: Animalia
- Phylum: Mollusca
- Class: Gastropoda
- Subclass: Caenogastropoda
- Order: Neogastropoda
- Superfamily: Volutoidea
- Family: Marginellidae
- Genus: Ovaginella; Laseron, 1957

Type species
- Marginella ovulum G. B. Sowerby II, 1846

= Ovaginella =

Genus of gastropods

Ovaginella is a genus of marginellid minute sea snails, marine gastropod mollusks in the subfamily Austroginellinae of the family Marginellidae, the margin snails.

== Species ==
- † Ovaginella arenula Darragh, 2017
- Ovaginella decaryi (Bavay, 1920)
- Ovaginella maoria (Powell, 1937)
- † Ovaginella mumiformis Darragh, 2017
- Ovaginella ovulum (G. B. Sowerby II, 1846)
- Ovaginella profunda (Suter, 1909)
- Ovaginella tenisoni (Pritchard, 1900)

Synonyms

- Ovaginella cylichnella (May, 1918): synonym of Balanetta cylichnella (May, 1918)
- Ovaginella nielseni (Laseron, 1948): synonym of Cystiscus minutissimus (Tenison Woods, 1876)
- Ovaginella rotunda (Laseron, 1948): synonym of Ovaginella tenisoni (Pritchard, 1900)
- Ovaginella stiria (Cotton, 1949): synonym of Ovaginella tenisoni (Pritchard, 1900)
- Ovaginella whani (Pritchard & Gatliff, 1900): synonym of Balanetta baylii Jousseaume, 1875
