= Marginella gabrielae =

Scientific classification
- Kingdom: Animalia
- Phylum: Mollusca
- Class: Gastropoda
- Subclass: Caenogastropoda
- Order: Neogastropoda
- Family: Marginellidae
- Genus: Marginella
- Species: M. gabrielae

Binomial name
- Marginella gabrielae Bozzetti, 1998

Species of gastropod

Marginella gabrielae is a species of sea snail, a marine gastropod mollusk in the family Marginellidae, the margin snails.
