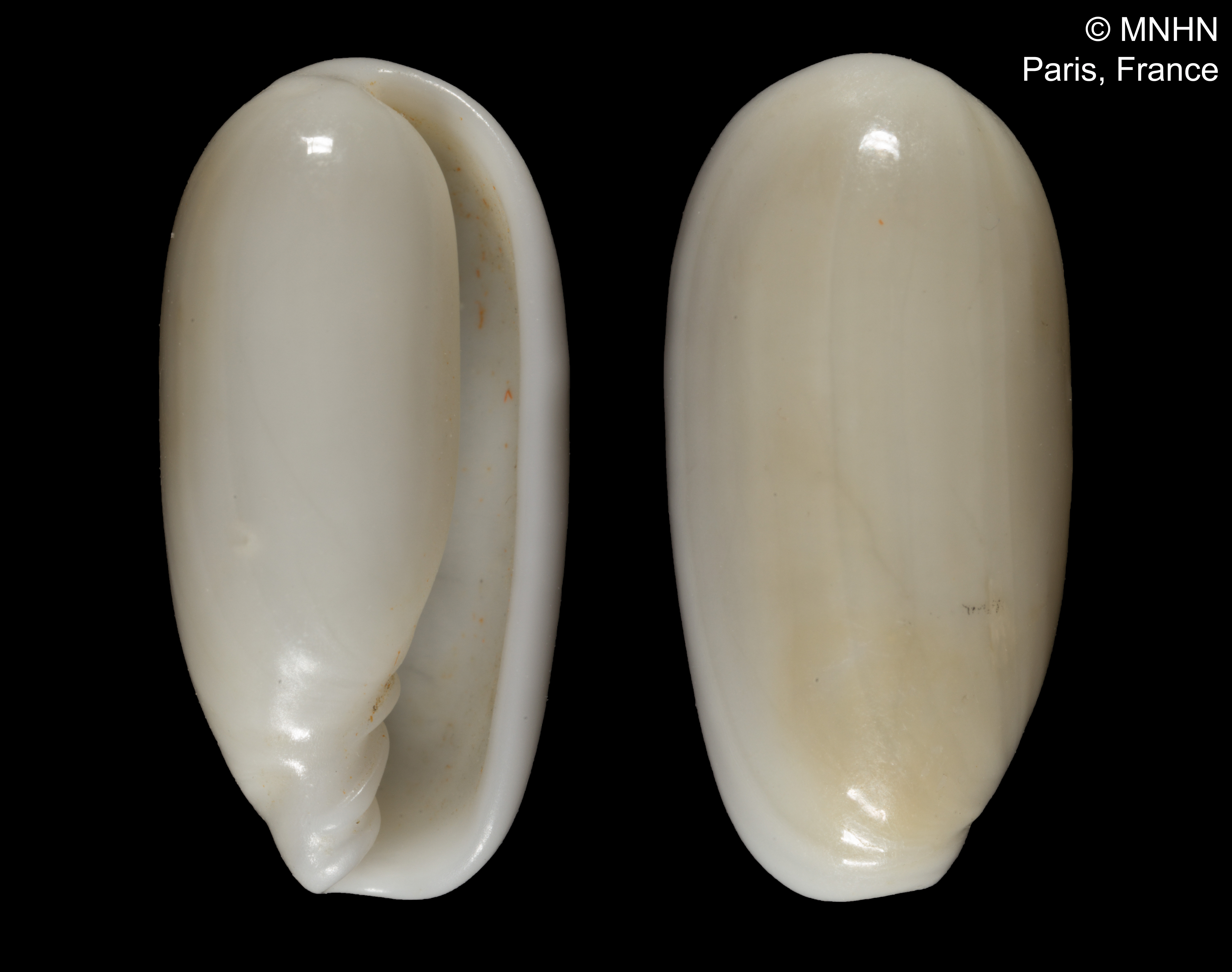
- Shell of Balanetta baylii (syntype at MNHN, Paris)

Scientific classification
- Kingdom: Animalia
- Phylum: Mollusca
- Class: Gastropoda
- Subclass: Caenogastropoda
- Order: Neogastropoda
- Superfamily: Volutoidea
- Family: Marginellidae
- Genus: Balanetta; Jousseaume, 1875

Type species
- Balanetta baylii Jousseaume, 1875

= Balanetta =

Genus of gastropods

Balanetta is a genus of small, often colorful, sea snails, marine gastropod molluscs in the taxonomic family of the margin shells (Marginellidae).

== Species ==
- Balanetta amydrozona (Melvill, 1906)
- Balanetta baylii Jousseaume, 1875
- Balanetta cylichnella (May, 1917)
- Balanetta pisum (Reeve, 1865)
- Balanetta triptycta Le Renard & van Nieulande, 1985

Species brought into synonymy

- Balanetta baylei Jousseaume, 1875: synonym of Balanetta baylii Jousseaume, 1875 (alternative original spelling; spelling baylii selected by First Reviser choice by Tomlin (1917))
- Balanetta decaryi Bavay, 1920: synonym of Ovaginella decaryi (Bavay, 1920)
- Balanetta ovulum (G.B. Sowerby II, 1846): synonym of Ovaginella ovulum (G.B. Sowerby II, 1846)
