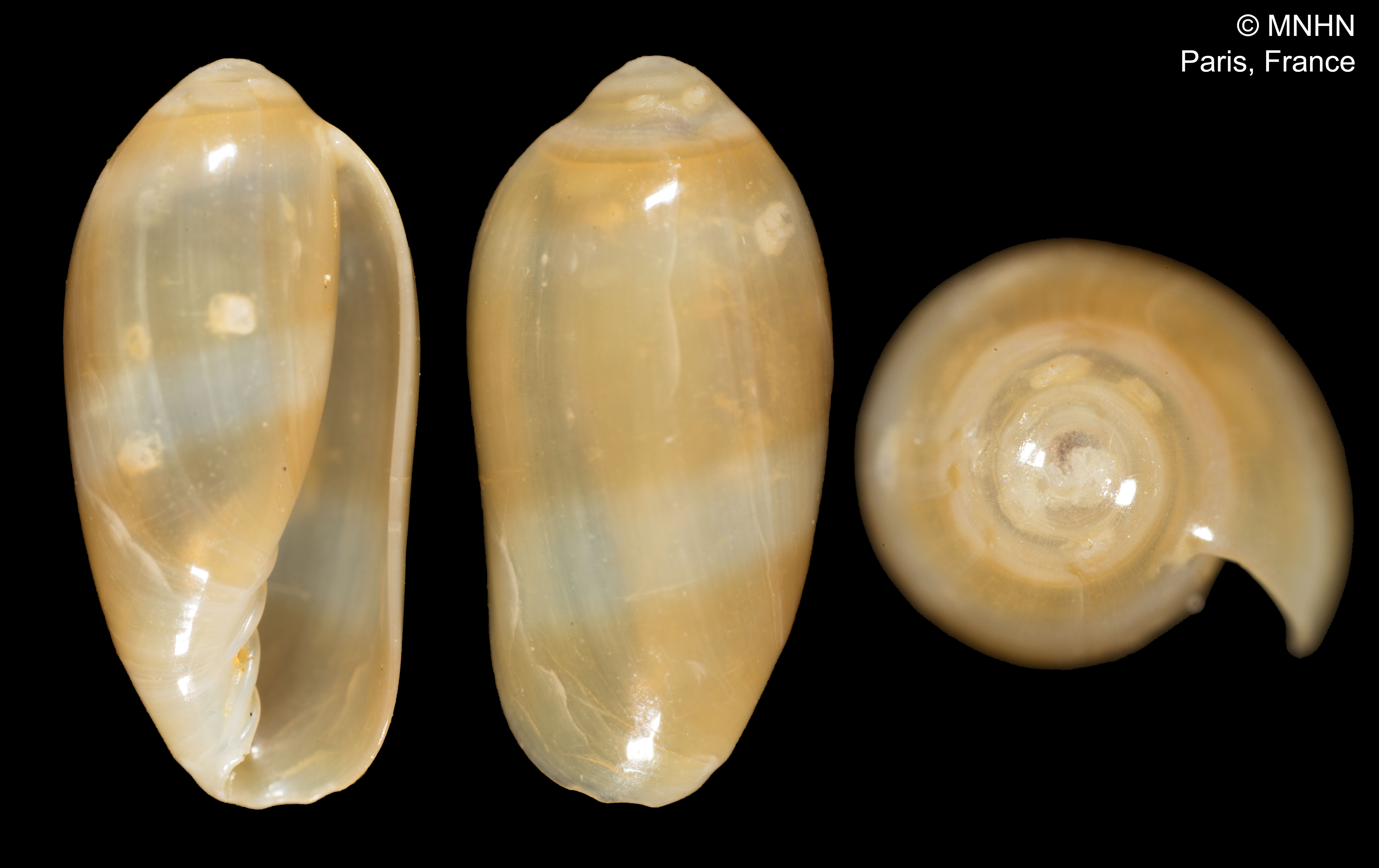
- Shell of Mirpurina peregrina (holotype at MNHN, Paris)

Scientific classification
- Kingdom: Animalia
- Phylum: Mollusca
- Class: Gastropoda
- Subclass: Caenogastropoda
- Order: Neogastropoda
- Superfamily: Volutoidea
- Family: Marginellidae
- Subfamily: Pruninae
- Genus: Mirpurina; Ortea, Moro & Espinosa, 2019

Type species
- Volvarina illaqueo Ortea, Moro & Espinosa, 2019

Synonyms
- Volvarina (Mirpurina) Ortea, Moro & Espinosa, 2019 (original rank)

= Mirpurina =

Genus of gastropods

Mirpurina is a genus of sea snails, marine gastropod mollusks in the subfamily Pruninae of the family Marginellidae, the margin snails.

== Species ==
Species within the genus Mirpurina include:

- Mirpurina antoniogonzalezi Ortea, Moro & Espinosa, 2019
- Mirpurina blezai (Ortea, 2019)
- Mirpurina britoi Ortea, 2019
- Mirpurina buracona Ortea, Moro & Espinosa, 2019
- Mirpurina colunga Ortea, 2023
- Mirpurina delgadoi Ortea, Moro & Espinosa, 2019
- Mirpurina emiliosoleri (Ortea & Moro, 2019)
- Mirpurina illaqueo (Ortea, Moro & Espinosa, 2019)
- Mirpurina mediocincta (E. A. Smith, 1875)
- Mirpurina morna (Ortea, 2019)
- Mirpurina natura Ortea & Moro, 2022
- Mirpurina nava Ortea & Moro, 2023
- Mirpurina nunoi (Moro, Espinosa & Ortea, 2019)
- Mirpurina nuriae (Moreno & Burnay, 1999)
- Mirpurina peregrina (Gofas & F. Fernandes, 1992)
- Mirpurina ruanoi Ortea, Moro & Espinosa, 2019
- Mirpurina verdensis (E. A. Smith, 1875)
- Mirpurina villaviciosa Ortea & Moro, 2023

Synonyms

- Mirpurina edytavaresi Ortea & Moro, 2023 (unaccepted > interim unpublished)
- Mirpurina serafinae Ortea, 2023 (unaccepted > interim unpublished)
