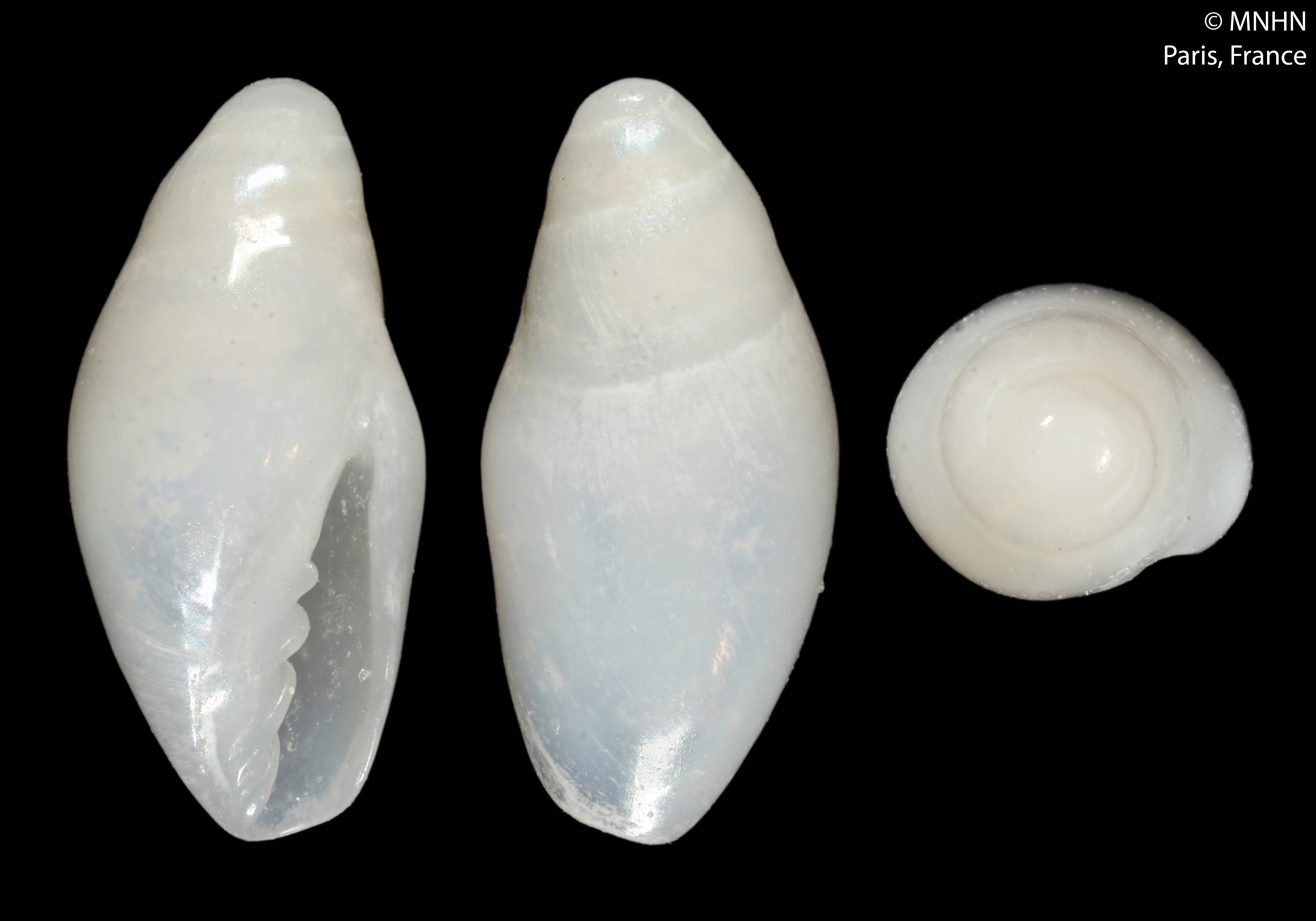
- Shell of Demissa philippinarum (holotype at MNHN, Paris)

Scientific classification
- Kingdom: Animalia
- Phylum: Mollusca
- Class: Gastropoda
- Subclass: Caenogastropoda
- Order: Neogastropoda
- Superfamily: Volutoidea
- Family: Marginellidae
- Genus: Demissa; Boyer, 2016

Type species
- Marginella nevilli Jousseaume, 1875

= Demissa =

Genus of gastropods

Demissa is a genus of snails, gastropod mollusks in the family Marginellidae, the margin snails.

== Species ==
- Demissa alisonae Boyer, 2016
- Demissa angelozzii Cossignani & Lorenz, 2018
- Demissa benthedii Boyer, 2016
- Demissa borbonica Boyer, 2016
- Demissa carolinensis Boyer, 2016
- Demissa cecalupoi (Cossignani, 2005)
- Demissa deformis (G. Nevill & H. Nevill, 1874)
- Demissa fusulina Boyer, 2016
- Demissa lorenzi Boyer, 2016
- Demissa maccleeryi Boyer, 2016
- Demissa maldiviensis Boyer, 2016
- Demissa masirana Boyer, 2016
- Demissa meridionalis Boyer, 2016
- Demissa nevilli (Jousseaume, 1875)
- Demissa philippinarum Boyer, 2016
- Demissa poppei Boyer, 2016
- Demissa procrita (Kilburn, 1977)
- Demissa pupa Boyer, 2018
- Demissa santoensis Boyer, 2016
- Demissa volunta (Laseron, 1957)
- Demissa zanzibarica Boyer, 2016
