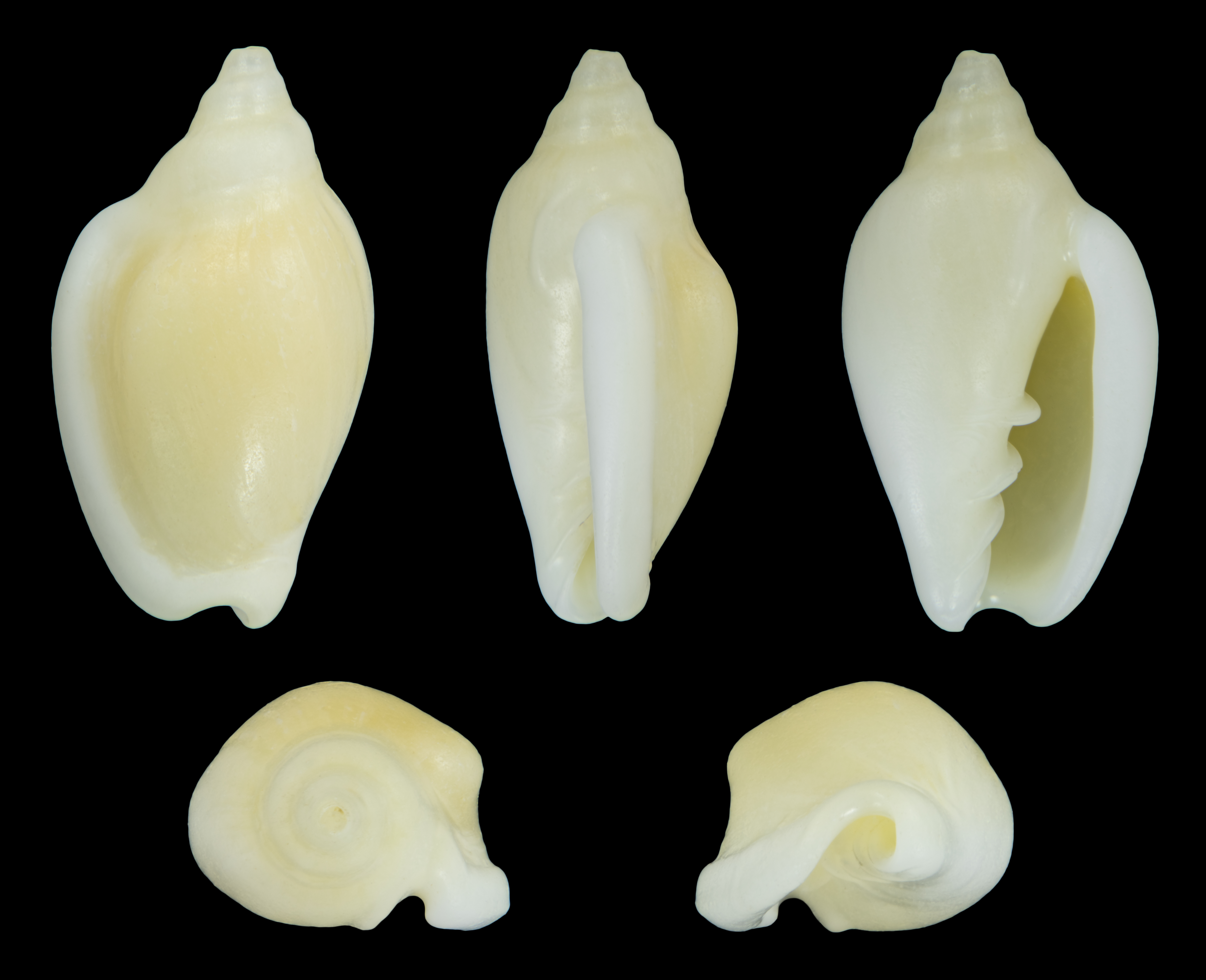
- Shell of Austroginella muscaria

Scientific classification
- Kingdom: Animalia
- Phylum: Mollusca
- Class: Gastropoda
- Subclass: Caenogastropoda
- Order: Neogastropoda
- Superfamily: Volutoidea
- Family: Marginellidae
- Subfamily: Austroginellinae
- Genus: Austroginella; Laseron, 1957

Type species
- Marginella muscaria Lamarck, 1822

Species
- See text
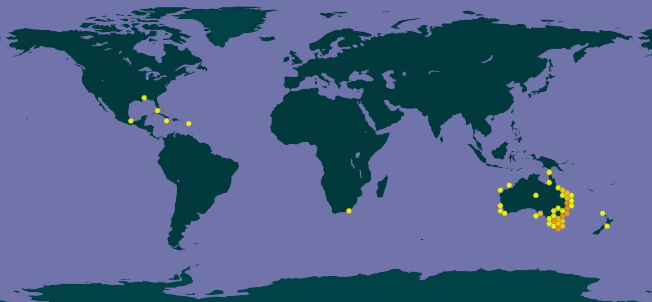

Synonyms
- Plicaginella Laseron, 1957 ·

= Austroginella =

Genus of gastropods

Austroginella is a genus of sea snails, marine gastropod mollusks in the subfamily Austroginellinae of the family Marginellidae.

== Species ==
- † Austroginella aldingae (Tate, 1878)
- Austroginella formicula (Lamarck, 1822)
- Austroginella georgiana (May, 1915)
- † Austroginella glaessneri (Ludbrook, 1958)
- Austroginella johnstoni (Petterd, 1884)
- Austroginella muscaria (Lamarck, 1822)
- † Austroginella muscarioides (Tate, 1878)
- †Austroginella praeformicula (Chapman & Gabriel, 1914)
- Austroginella praetermissa (May, 1915)
- Austroginella queenslandica Laseron, 1957
- Austroginella tasmanica (Tenison Woods, 1876)
- Austroginella translucida (G. B. Sowerby II, 1846)

Synonyms

- Austroginella humerica (Laseron, 1948): synonym of Austroginella translucida (G. B. Sowerby II, 1846)
- Austroginella vercoi (May, 1911): synonym of Alaginella vercoi (May, 1911)
