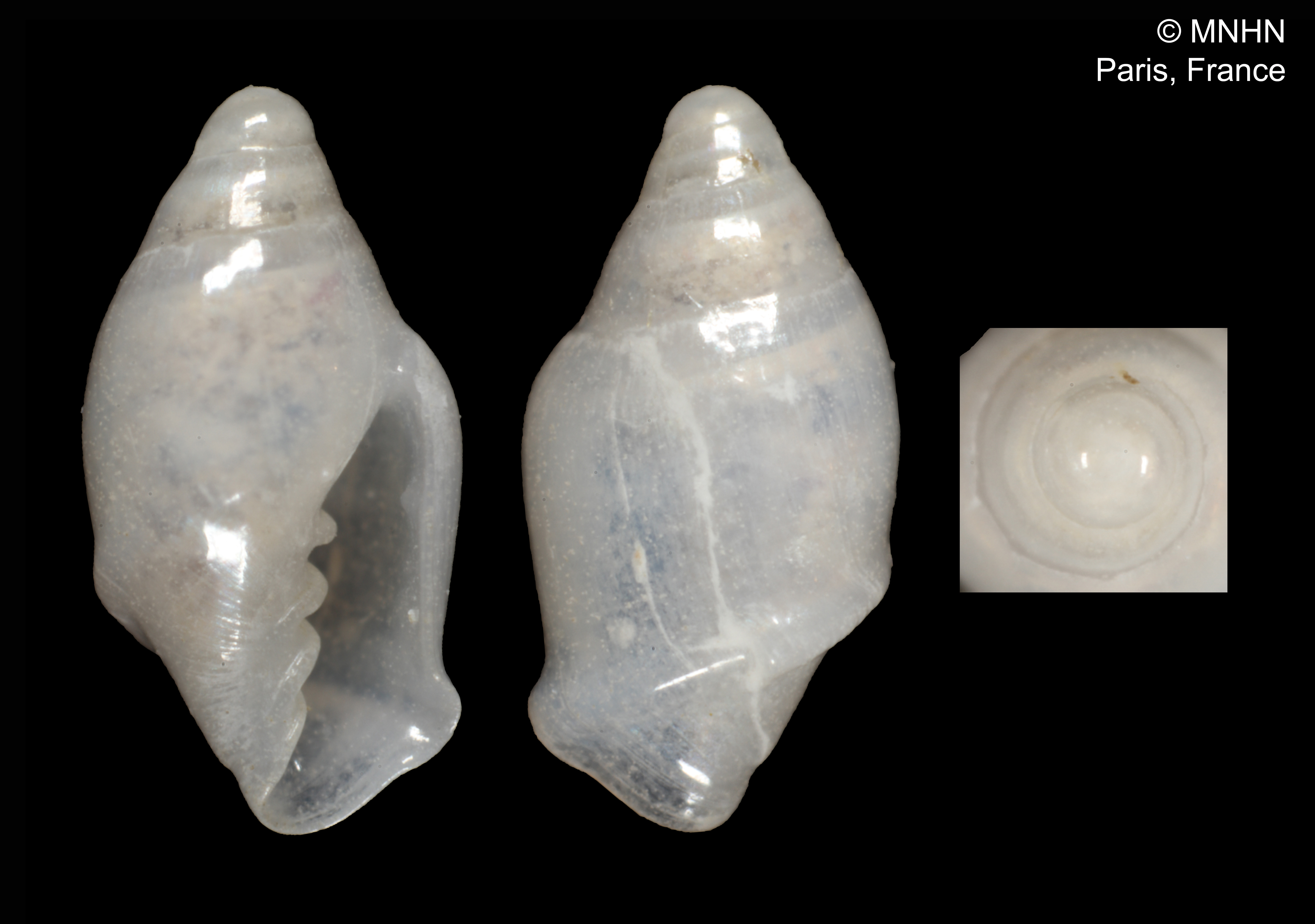
- Shell of Gibbacousteau jacquesi (holotype at MNHN, Paris)

Scientific classification
- Kingdom: Animalia
- Phylum: Mollusca
- Class: Gastropoda
- Subclass: Caenogastropoda
- Order: Neogastropoda
- Superfamily: Volutoidea
- Family: Marginellidae
- Subfamily: Marginellinae
- Genus: Gibbacousteau; Espinosa & Ortea, 2013

Type species
- Gibbacousteau jacquesi Espinosa & Ortea, 2013

= Gibbacousteau =

Genus of gastropods

Gibbacousteau is a genus of sea snails, marine gastropod mollusks in the family Marginellidae, the margin snails.

== Species ==
Species within the genus Gibbacousteau include:

- Gibbacousteau jacquesi Espinosa & Ortea, 2013
