= Marigordiella =

Scientific classification
- Kingdom: Animalia
- Phylum: Mollusca
- Class: Gastropoda
- Subclass: Caenogastropoda
- Order: Neogastropoda
- Family: Marginellidae
- Genus: Marigordiella; Espinosa & Ortea, 2010
- Species: M. parviginella

Binomial name
- Marigordiella parviginella (Espinosa & Ortea, 2005)

Synonyms
- Volvarina parviginella Espinosa & Ortea, 2006 (basionym)

Genus of gastropods

Marigordiella parviginella is the only species of sea snail, a marine gastropod mollusk in the genus Marigordiella; family Marginellidae, the margin snails.
