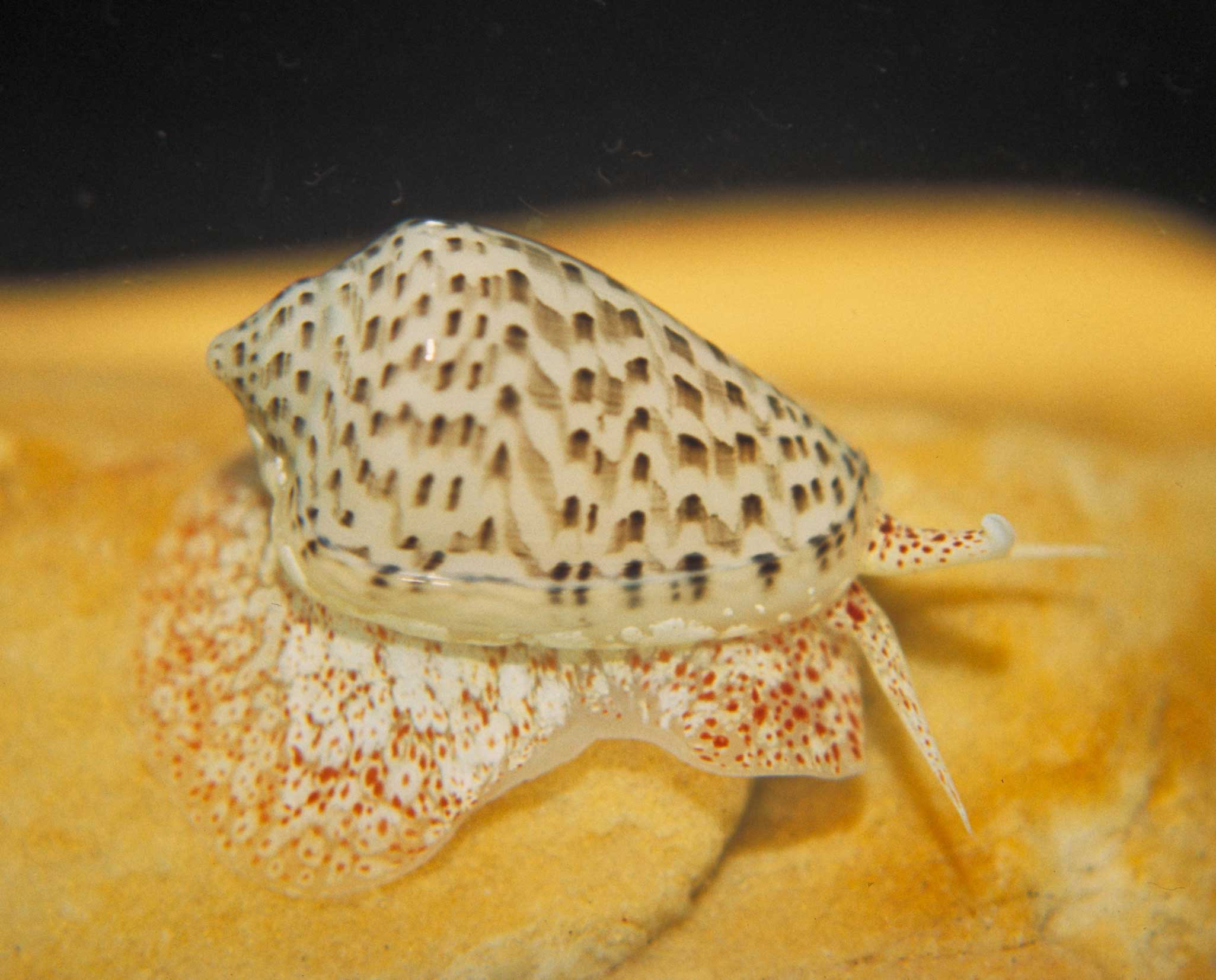
- A live individual of Marginella mosaica, head end towards the right

Scientific classification
- Kingdom: Animalia
- Phylum: Mollusca
- Class: Gastropoda
- Subclass: Caenogastropoda
- Order: Neogastropoda
- Superfamily: Volutoidea
- Family: Marginellidae; Fleming, 1828

Diversity
- 2 freshwater species, others are marine

= Marginellidae =

Family of sea snails

Marginellidae, or the margin shells, are a taxonomic family of small, often colorful, sea snails, marine gastropod molluscs in the clade Neogastropoda.

== Taxonomy ==
The higher classification of the family Marginellidae has long been in a state of confusion. Many popular works still treat all members of this family under the single genus Marginella, basing them primarily on superficial similarities of the shell.

The confusion over the classification stems from the fact that the earlier classifications were based rather crudely on shell characters. Although many good differential shell characters do exist within this group, those characters were generally misinterpreted or not recognized as significant. Such information as did exist on the radulae and the external anatomy of the living animals was widely scattered in the scientific literature, and internal anatomical descriptions were not available until fairly recently.

In 2019 a new molecular phylogeny of marginelliform gastropods has been established by Fedosov A.E., Caballer Gutierrez M., Buge B., Sorokin P.V., Puillandre N., Bouchet P.

== Shell description ==
The shell of Marginellidae is usually small, but varies in different species from minute to medium-sized. The external color of the shell can be white, cream, yellow, orange, red, or brown, and can be uniformly colored, or patterned in various ways. The protoconch is paucispiral. The lip of the shell is thickened, and can be smooth or denticulate. An external varix may be present or absent, a siphonal notch may be present or absent. The columella may have 2-6 plications. The operculum is absent in this family.

== Genera ==
- Janaginella T. Cossignani & Lorenz, 2021
- Subfamily Austroginellinae G. A. Coovert & H. K. Coovert, 1995

- Alaginella Laseron, 1957
- Austroginella Laseron, 1957
- † Conuginella Laseron, 1957
- Hydroginella Laseron, 1957
- Marigordiella Espinosa & Ortea, 2010
- Mesoginella Laseron, 1957
- † Mioginella Laseron, 1957
- Ovaginella Laseron, 1957
- Protoginella Laseron, 1957
- Serrata Jousseaume, 1875
- † Stromboginella Laseron, 1957

- Subfamily Marginellinae Fleming, 1828

- Africosta S. G. Veldsman, 2022
- Dentimargo Cossmann, 1899
- Eratoidea Weinkauff, 1879
- † Euryentome Cossmann, 1899
- Gibbacousteau Espinosa & Ortea, 2013
- Glabella Swainson, 1840
- Marginella Lamarck, 1799
- † Myobarbum Sohl, 1963
- Nudifaba Eames, 1952
- Simplicoglabella Sacco, 1890
- †Stazzania Sacco, 1890
- Volvarina Hinds, 1844

- Subfamily Pruninae G. A. Coovert & H. K. Coovert, 1995

- Balanetta Jousseaume, 1875
- Bullata Jousseaume, 1875
- Closia Gray, 1857
- Cryptospira Hinds, 1844
- Hyalina Schumacher, 1817
- Mirpurina Ortea, Moro & Espinosa, 2019
- Prunum Herrmannsen, 1852
- Rivomarginella Brandt, 1968

Subfamily Incertae sedis

- Demissa Boyer, 2016

== Synonyms ==
- Granulininae G. A. Coovert & H. K. Coovert, 1995: synonym of Granulinidae G. A. Coovert & H. K. Coovert, 1995 (original rank)
- Marginelloninae Coan, 1965: synonym of Marginellonidae Coan, 1965 (original rank)
- Carinaginella Laseron, 1957: synonym of Alaginella Laseron, 1957
- Cassoginella Laseron, 1957 †: synonym of Alaginella Laseron, 1957
- Deviginella Laseron, 1957: synonym of Mesoginella Laseron, 1957
- Haloginella Laseron, 1957: synonym of Serrata Jousseaume, 1875
- Neptoginella Laseron, 1957: synonym of Hydroginella Laseron, 1957
- Pillarginella Gabriel, 1962: synonym of Hydroginella Laseron, 1957
- Plicaginella Laseron, 1957: synonym of Austroginella Laseron, 1957
- Serrataginella G. A. Coovert & H. K. Coovert, 1995: synonym of Serrata Jousseaume, 1875
- Sinuginella Laseron, 1957: synonym of Mesoginella Laseron, 1957
- Spiroginella Laseron, 1957: synonym of Mesoginella Laseron, 1957
- Triginella Laseron, 1957: synonym of Alaginella Laseron, 1957
- Cucumis "Klein": synonym of Marginella Lamarck, 1799 (unavailable name)
- Faba P. Fischer, 1883: synonym of Glabella Swainson, 1840 (objective synonym of Glabella)
- Longinella Laseron, 1957: synonym of Dentimargo Cossmann, 1899 (preoccupied by Longinella Gros & Lestage, 1927 [Ephemeroptera])
- Marginellarius Duméril, 1805: synonym of Marginella Lamarck, 1799
- Marginellus Montfort, 1810: synonym of Marginella Lamarck, 1799 (unjustified emendation of Marginella)
- Porcellana Gray, 1847: synonym of Marginella Lamarck, 1799 (invalid: junior homonym of Porcellana Lamarck, 1801 [Crustacea])
- Pseudomarginella Maltzan, 1880: synonym of Marginella Lamarck, 1799
- Volvarinella Habe, 1951: synonym of Dentimargo Cossmann, 1899
- Egouana: synonym of Egouena Jousseaume, 1875: synonym of Prunum Herrmannsen, 1852 (invalid: incorrect alternative original spelling)
- Egouena Jousseaume, 1875: synonym of Prunum Herrmannsen, 1852
- Gibberulina Monterosato, 1884: synonym of Bullata Jousseaume, 1875
- Leptegouana Woodring, 1928: synonym of Prunum Herrmannsen, 1852
- Porcellanella Conrad, 1863 †: synonym of Prunum Herrmannsen, 1852 ( invalid: junior homonym of Porcellanella White, 1852 [Crustacea].)
- Volutella Swainson, 1831: synonym of Bullata Jousseaume, 1875 (invalid: junior homonym of Volutella Perry, 1810 [Vasidae])
