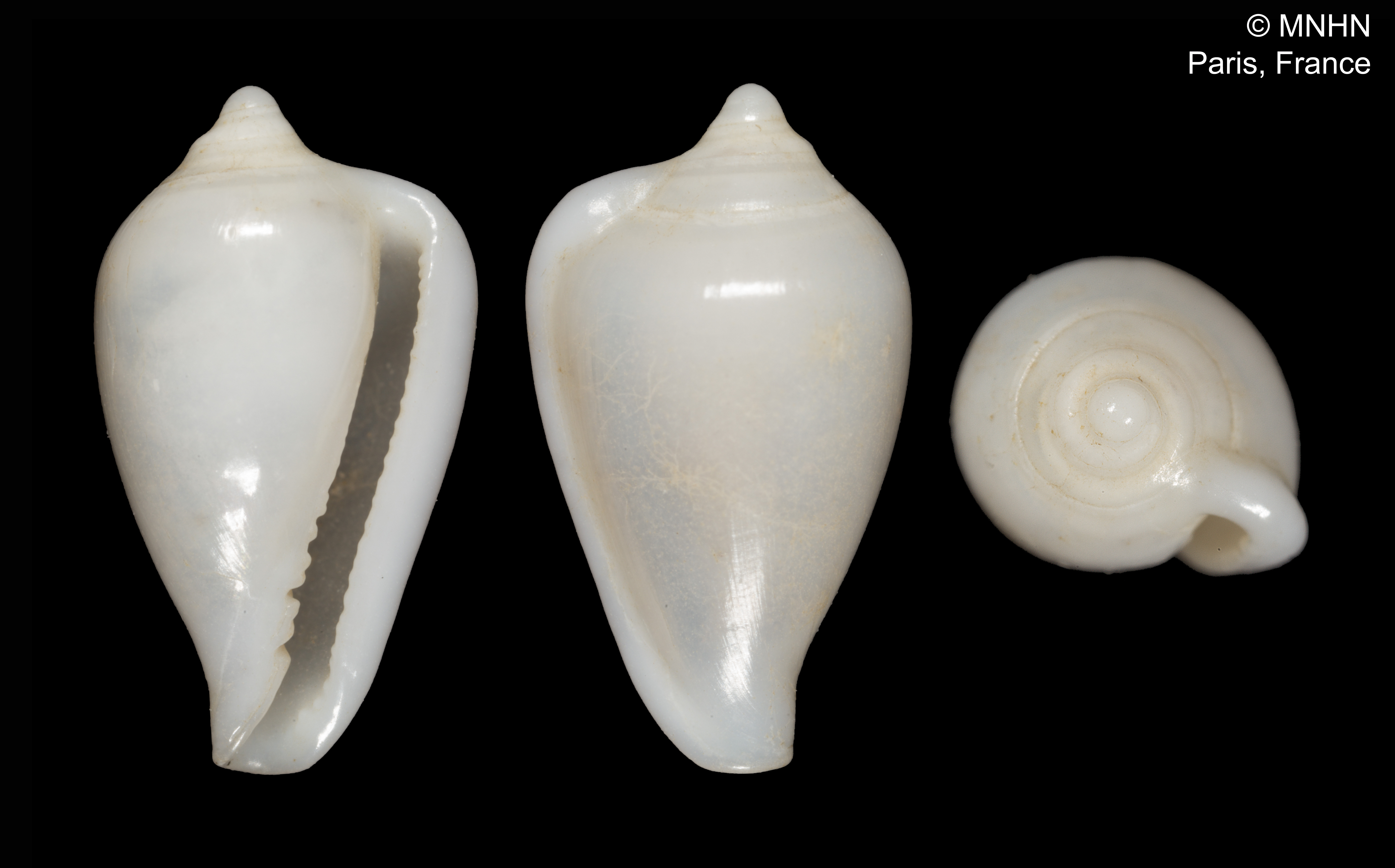
- Protoginella caledonica

Scientific classification
- Kingdom: Animalia
- Phylum: Mollusca
- Class: Gastropoda
- Subclass: Caenogastropoda
- Order: Neogastropoda
- Superfamily: Volutoidea
- Family: Marginellidae
- Subfamily: Austroginellinae
- Genus: Protoginella; Laseron, 1957

Type species
- Marginella lavigata Brazier, 1877

= Protoginella =

Genus of gastropods

Protoginella is a genus of sea snails, marine gastropod molluscs in the subfamily Austroginellinae of the family Marginellidae, the margin snails.

== Species ==
According to the World Register of Marine Species (WoRMS), the following species with valid names are included within the genus Protoginella :

- † Protoginella atkinsoni (May, 1922)
- † Protoginella bellensis (Beu, 1970)
- † Protoginella bembix P. A. Maxwell, 1988
- Protoginella caledonica Boyer, 2001
- † Protoginella cenodoxa P. A. Maxwell, 1992
- † Protoginella conica (G. F. Harris, 1897)
- † Protoginella corpulenta (May, 1922)
- Protoginella laseroni Boyer, 2001
- Protoginella lavigata (Brazier, 1877)
- Protoginella maestratii Boyer, 2002
- † Protoginella micula (Tate, 1878)
- † Protoginella opoitia (Marwick, 1965)
- Protoginella praetera Laseron, 1957
- Protoginella reborai T. Cossignani, 2011
- Protoginella turbiniformis (Bavay, 1917)
- † Protoginella wentworthii (Tate, 1877)
- † Protoginella whitecliffensis (Marwick, 1926)

Synonyms

- Protoginella geminata (Hedley, 1912): synonym of Alaginella geminata (Hedley, 1912)
- † Protoginella labinensis P. A. Maxwell, 1988: synonym of † Alaginella labinensis (P. A. Maxwell, 1988)
- † Protoginella parvisinus P. A. Maxwell, 1992: synonym of † Alaginella parvisinus (P. A. Maxwell, 1992)
- Protoginella valida (R. B. Watson, 1886): synonym of Alaginella valida (R. B. Watson, 1886)
- Protoginella weedingi (Cotton, 1944): synonym of Alaginella geminata (Hedley, 1912)
