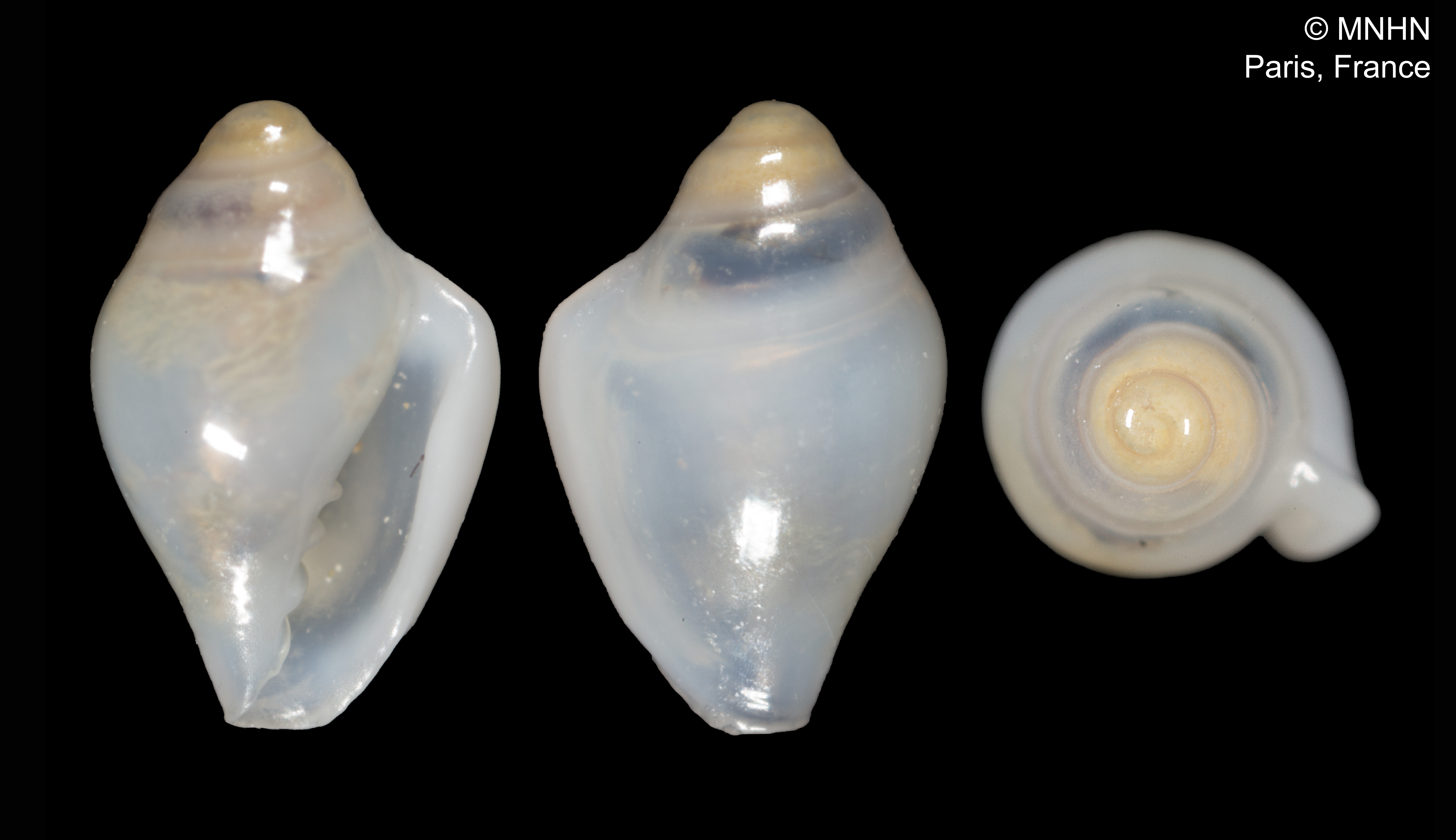
- Shell of Alaginella cottoni (holotype at MNHN, Paris)

Scientific classification
- Kingdom: Animalia
- Phylum: Mollusca
- Class: Gastropoda
- Subclass: Caenogastropoda
- Order: Neogastropoda
- Superfamily: Volutoidea
- Family: Marginellidae
- Subfamily: Austroginellinae
- Genus: Alaginella; Laseron, 1957

Type species
- Marginella ochracea Angas, 1871

Species
- See text

Synonyms
- Carinaginella Laseron, 1957; Cassoginella Laseron, 1957; Protoginella (Alaginella) Laseron, 1957; Triginella Laseron, 1957

= Alaginella =

Genus of gastropods

Alaginella is a genus of sea snails, marine gastropod mollusks in the subfamily Austroginellinae of the family Marginellidae.

== Species ==
Species within the genus Alaginella include:

- Alaginella aikeni Lussi, 2013
- Alaginella albino (Laseron, 1957)
- Alaginella atractus (Tomlin, 1918)
- Alaginella borda (Cotton, 1944)
- Alaginella brazieri (E.A. Smith, 1891)
- Alaginella carinata (E.A. Smith, 1891)
- † Alaginella clisia (Cotton, 1949)
- Alaginella cottoni Boyer, 2001
- † Alaginella fraudulenta (Suter, 1917)
- Alaginella gatliffi (May, 1911)
- Alaginella geminata (Hedley, 1912)
- Alaginella kerochuta (Shackleford, 1914)
- † Alaginella labinensis (P. A. Maxwell, 1988)
- Alaginella malina (Hedley, 1915)
- Alaginella ochracea (Angas, 1871)
- Alaginella pachia (R. B. Watson, 1886)
- † Alaginella palla (Cotton, 1949)
- † Alaginella parvisinus (P. A. Maxwell, 1992)
- Alaginella pemphix (Roth, 1973)
- Alaginella pygmora (Laseron, 1957)
- † Alaginella totangiensis (Marwick, 1931)
- Alaginella valida (Watson, 1886)
- Alaginella vercoi (May, 1911)
- † Alaginella waikohuensis (Marwick, 1931)
- Alaginella zeyheri (Krauss, 1852)

Species brought into synonymy

- Alaginella aupouria Powell, 1937 : synonym of Mesoginella aupouria (Powell, 1937)
- Alaginella clara (Thiele, 1925): synonym of Dentimargo clara (Thiele, 1925)
- Alaginella julia (Thiele, 1925): synonym of Alaginella atractus (Tomlin, 1918)
- Alaginella laeviplicata (Laseron, 1948) : synonym of Alaginella ochracea (Angas, 1871)
- Alaginella sica Cotton, 1957: synonym of Alaginella vercoi (May, 1911)
- Alaginella umlaasensis (Lussi & G. Smith, 1996): synonym of Volvarina umlaasensis Lussi & G. Smith, 1996
