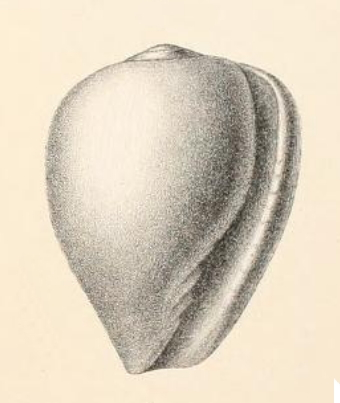
- Shell of Alaginella pachia (holotype)

Scientific classification
- Kingdom: Animalia
- Phylum: Mollusca
- Class: Gastropoda
- Subclass: Caenogastropoda
- Order: Neogastropoda
- Family: Marginellidae
- Genus: Alaginella
- Species: A. pachia

Binomial name
- Alaginella pachia (R. B. Watson, 1886)

Synonyms
- Marginella (Glabella) pachia R. B. Watson, 1886 superseded combination; Marginella pachia R. B. Watson, 1886 superseded combination; Phyloginella pachia (R. B. Watson, 1886) superseded combination; Triginella pachia (R. B. Watson, 1886) superseded combination

= Alaginella pachia =

Species of gastropod

Alaginella pachia is a species of sea snail, a marine gastropod mollusk in the family Marginellidae, the margin snails.

== Description ==
The length of the shell attains 2.4 mm.

(Original description) Shell: Small, obovate, with a scarcely noticeable spire, strong and porcellanous white, lustrous, with an exceedingly narrow aperture. The outer lip is truncate but not emarginate, varixed, and toothless, while the columella has four small folds ending in a sharp point.

Sculpture: Only faint growth lines are present.

Color: White and more or less translucent.

Spire: Just perceptibly raised, more noticeable by color than form, with the suture slightly more opaque than the rest of the whorls. The apex is minutely mamillate.

Whorls: Four, small whorls, barely convex on the spire. The body whorlis tumid, with a rounded, conical, and produced base. The suture is barely traceable but still slightly impressed.

Aperture: Long, narrow, and slightly curved, with parallel lips. The outer lip rises as high as the apex, ascends slightly at its insertion with a feeble, bluntly angular sinus, and is obliquely truncate in front but not emarginate. The forward edge is blunt and barely convex, with a strong, broad varix. The inner lip is broadly thickened and spread out on the body, barely convex. About two-fifths of its length is occupied by the folds, the highest being horizontal and the lower three slightly stronger, very oblique, and recognizable across the pad of enamel encircling the point of the base. The foremost fold is too feeble to form a reverted flange around the tip of the columella.

== Distribution ==
This marine species is endemic to Australia and occurs off Queensland and in the Torres Strait.
