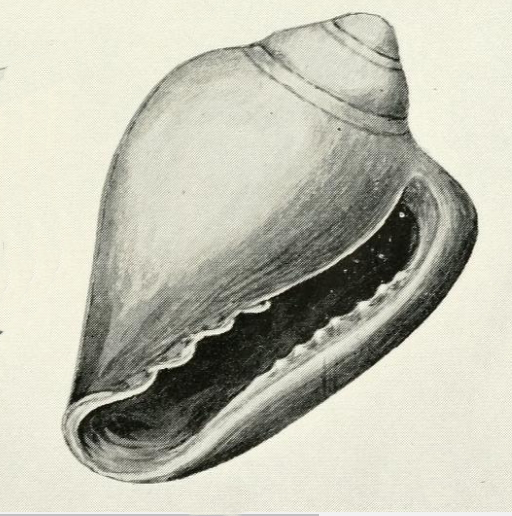
- Shell of Alaginella gatliffi (holotype)

Scientific classification
- Kingdom: Animalia
- Phylum: Mollusca
- Class: Gastropoda
- Subclass: Caenogastropoda
- Order: Neogastropoda
- Family: Marginellidae
- Genus: Alaginella
- Species: A. gatliffi

Binomial name
- Alaginella gatliffi (May, 1911)

Synonyms
- Marginella gatliffi May, 1911 (original combination)

= Alaginella gatliffi =

Species of gastropod

Alaginella gatliffi is a species of sea snail, a marine gastropod mollusk in the family Marginellidae, the margin snails.

== Description ==
The length of the shell varies between 3 mm and 4 mm.

(Original description) The shell is broadly pyriform and solid, with a moderately elevated, blunt spire. It has very broad shoulders that narrow significantly towards the front. The shell is yellowish-white. It comprises three rounded whorls. The aperture is moderate, slightly widening towards the rounded front. The outer lip is massive, with many varices, and partially ascends the spire, projecting almost at right angles to form a broad shoulder before bending sharply down with a strong outward curve. From a side view, the outer lip is also strongly curved towards the front. The inner edge is convex and features about seven irregularly spaced denticles. The columella is roundly convex above but hollowed where the four oblique plaits, of moderate size, are located, with the uppermost being the smallest.

== Distribution ==
This marine species is endemic to Australia and occurs off New South Wales, Queensland, Tasmania and Victoria.
