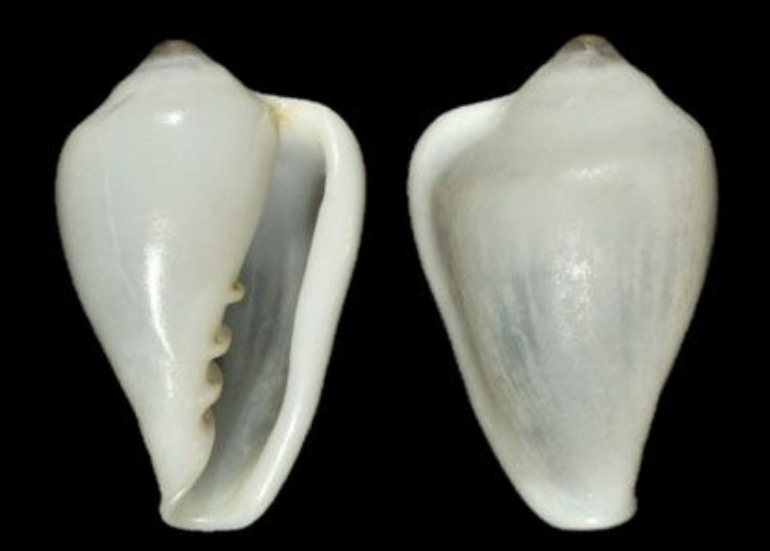
- Shell of Alaginella kerochuta (specimen at the Natural History Museum, Rotterdam)

Scientific classification
- Kingdom: Animalia
- Phylum: Mollusca
- Class: Gastropoda
- Subclass: Caenogastropoda
- Order: Neogastropoda
- Family: Marginellidae
- Genus: Alaginella
- Species: A. kerochuta

Binomial name
- Alaginella kerochuta (Shackleford, 1914)

Synonyms
- Marginella kerochuta Shackleford, 1914 (original combination)

= Alaginella kerochuta =

Species of gastropod

Alaginella kerochuta is a species of sea snail, a marine gastropod mollusk in the family Marginellidae, the margin snails.

== Description ==
The length of the shell attains 10 mm.

== Distribution ==
This marine species occurs off Cape Point, South Africa.
