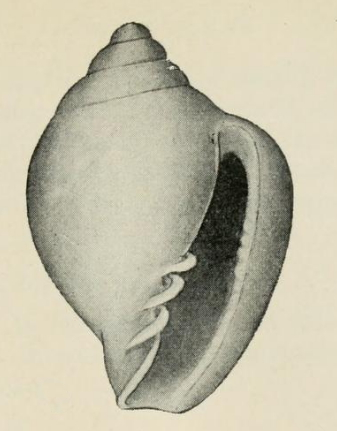
- Shell of Protoginella corpulenta (holotype)

Scientific classification
- Kingdom: Animalia
- Phylum: Mollusca
- Class: Gastropoda
- Subclass: Caenogastropoda
- Order: Neogastropoda
- Family: Marginellidae
- Subfamily: Austroginellinae
- Genus: Protoginella
- Species: †P. corpulenta

Binomial name
- †Protoginella corpulenta (May, 1922)

Synonyms
- † Marginella corpulenta May, 1922 † ·

= Protoginella corpulenta =

Extinct species of gastropod

Protoginella corpulenta is an extinct species of sea snail, a marine gastropod mollusk in the family Borsoniidae.

== Description ==
The length of the shell attains 5 mm, its diameter 3.3 mm.

(Original description) The shell is very broadly pyriform, with an elevated pyramidal spire and a mammillated apex.The shell contains four, well rounded whorls. They are very broadly shouldered. The aperture is large. The columella is very convex above, excavate below, where it bears four rather thin plications, of which the anterior is almost vertical, the others being more transverse. The outer lip is very rounded in outline much thickened, and slightly corrugated within.

== Distribution ==
This extinct marine species is endemic to Tasmania and were found in Tertiary strata.
