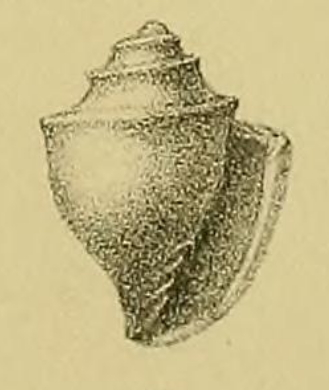
- Shell of Alaginella carinata (holotype)

Scientific classification
- Kingdom: Animalia
- Phylum: Mollusca
- Class: Gastropoda
- Subclass: Caenogastropoda
- Order: Neogastropoda
- Family: Marginellidae
- Genus: Alaginella
- Species: A. carinata

Binomial name
- Alaginella carinata (E. A. Smith, 1891)

Synonyms
- Carinaginella carinata (E. A. Smith, 1891); Marginella carinata E. A. Smith, 1891

= Alaginella carinata =

Species of gastropod

Alaginella carinata is a species of sea snail, a marine gastropod mollusk in the family Marginellidae, the margin snails.

== Description ==
The length of the shell attains 5.5 mm, its diameter 3.7 mm.

(Original description in Latin) The short shell is ovate-fusiform. it is polished white and smooth. It contains 5 whorls: the uppermost is convex, the following whorls are strongly excavated above, sharply angled, and slightly convex below the angle, tapering towards the base. The aperture is elongate and narrow, comprising about 7/11 of the shell's total length. The outer lip is very thickened and smooth inside. The columella features three thin but prominent folds that are obliquely curved anteriorly, covered along their length with a thin callus.

== Distribution ==
This marine species is endemic to Australia and occurs off New South Wales and Queensland.
