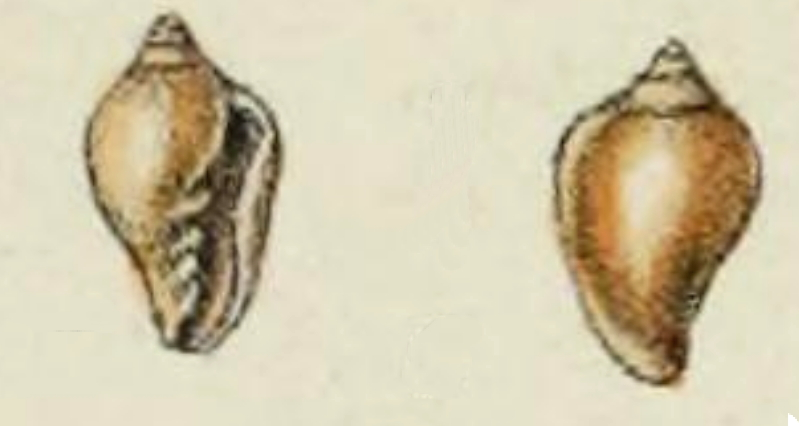
- Shell of Alaginella ochracea (holotype)

Scientific classification
- Kingdom: Animalia
- Phylum: Mollusca
- Class: Gastropoda
- Subclass: Caenogastropoda
- Order: Neogastropoda
- Family: Marginellidae
- Genus: Alaginella
- Species: A. ochracea

Binomial name
- Alaginella ochracea (Angas, 1871)

Synonyms
- Alaginella laeviplicata (Laseron, 1948); Marginella crescere Laseron, 1948; Marginella laeviplicata Laseron, 1948; Marginella metcalfei Angas, 1877; Marginella ochracea Angas, 1871 (original combination); Marginella ochracea var. crescere Laseron, 1948

= Alaginella ochracea =

Species of gastropod

Alaginella ochracea is a species of sea snail, a marine gastropod mollusk in the family Marginellidae, the margin snails.

== Description ==
The length of the shell varies between 3 mm and 4 mm.

(Original description) The shell is subtriangularly ovate, rather thin, smooth, and shining, more or less pale straw-colored with a frequent pale orange effuse band near the suture on the body whorl. The shell consists of four whorls with an obtusely conical spire that is very blunt at the apex. The aperture is rather narrow, with the outer lip variced and thickened in the middle; the varix is of a paler color than the body whorl. The columella has four plaits, with the posterior one slightly obliquely descending.

== Distribution ==
This marine species is endemic to Australia and occurs off New South Wales, Queensland, Tasmania, Victoria.
