= Alaginella pygmora =

Scientific classification
- Kingdom: Animalia
- Phylum: Mollusca
- Class: Gastropoda
- Subclass: Caenogastropoda
- Order: Neogastropoda
- Family: Marginellidae
- Genus: Alaginella
- Species: A. pygmora

Binomial name
- Alaginella pygmora Laseron, 1957

Species of gastropod

Alaginella pygmora is a species of sea snail, a marine gastropod mollusk in the family Marginellidae, the margin snails.

== Distribution ==
This marine species is endemic to Australia and occurs off Queensland.
