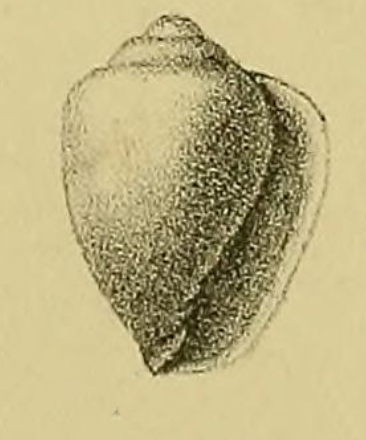
- Shell of Alaginella brazieri (holotype)

Scientific classification
- Kingdom: Animalia
- Phylum: Mollusca
- Class: Gastropoda
- Subclass: Caenogastropoda
- Order: Neogastropoda
- Family: Marginellidae
- Genus: Alaginella
- Species: A. brazieri

Binomial name
- Alaginella brazieri (E. A. Smith, 1891)

Synonyms
- Marginella brazieri E. A. Smith, 1891; Triginella brazieri (E. A. Smith, 1891) ·

= Alaginella brazieri =

Species of gastropod

Alaginella brazieri is a species of sea snail, a marine gastropod mollusk in the family Marginellidae, the margin snails.

== Description ==
The length of the shell attains 5 mm.

(Original description in Latin) The shell is small, short and broad. It is polished white with a translucent quality. The spire is very short and obtuse at the apex. The shell has 4 whorls, which are depressed near the suture and slightly emarginate. The body whorl is large, broadly rounded, and shouldered above, becoming narrowly contracted below. The aperture is moderately narrow, occupying about two-thirds of the shell's length. The columella is furnished with three thin folds. The outer lip is thickened on the outside and smooth on the inside. The oblique anterior termination of the columella passes into the outer lip.

== Distribution ==
This marine species is endemic to Australia and occurs off New South Wales, Queensland and Tasmania.
