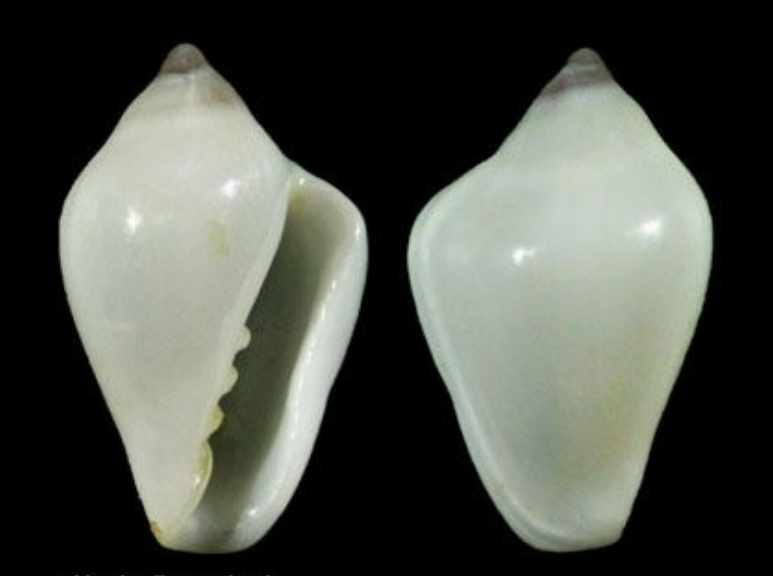
- Alaginella zeyheri (Krauss, 1852)

Scientific classification
- Kingdom: Animalia
- Phylum: Mollusca
- Class: Gastropoda
- Subclass: Caenogastropoda
- Order: Neogastropoda
- Family: Marginellidae
- Genus: Alaginella
- Species: A. zeyheri

Binomial name
- Alaginella zeyheri (Krauss, 1852)

= Alaginella zeyheri =

Species of gastropod

Alaginella zeyheri is a species of sea snail, a marine gastropod mollusk in the family Marginellidae, the margin snails.

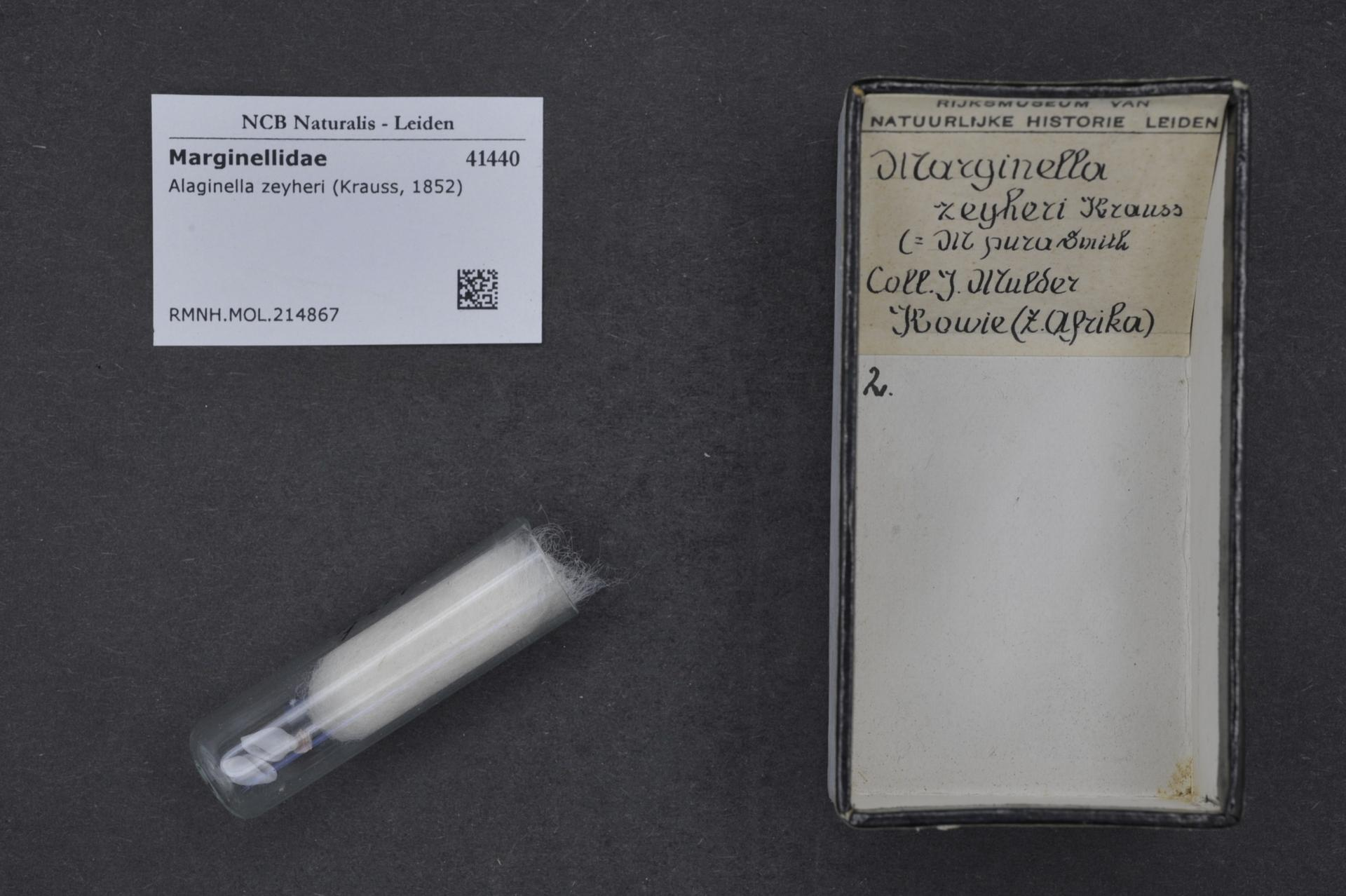

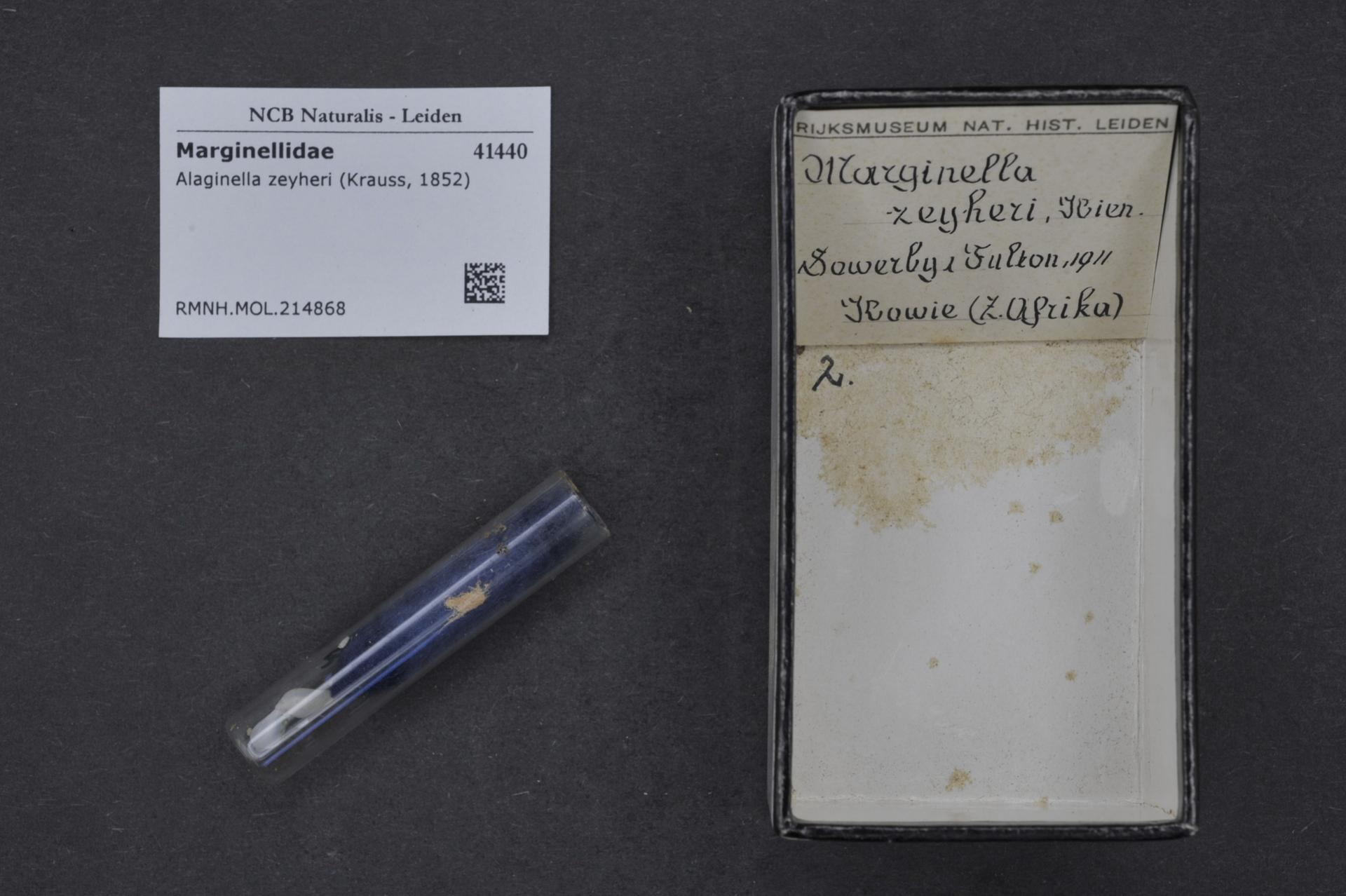

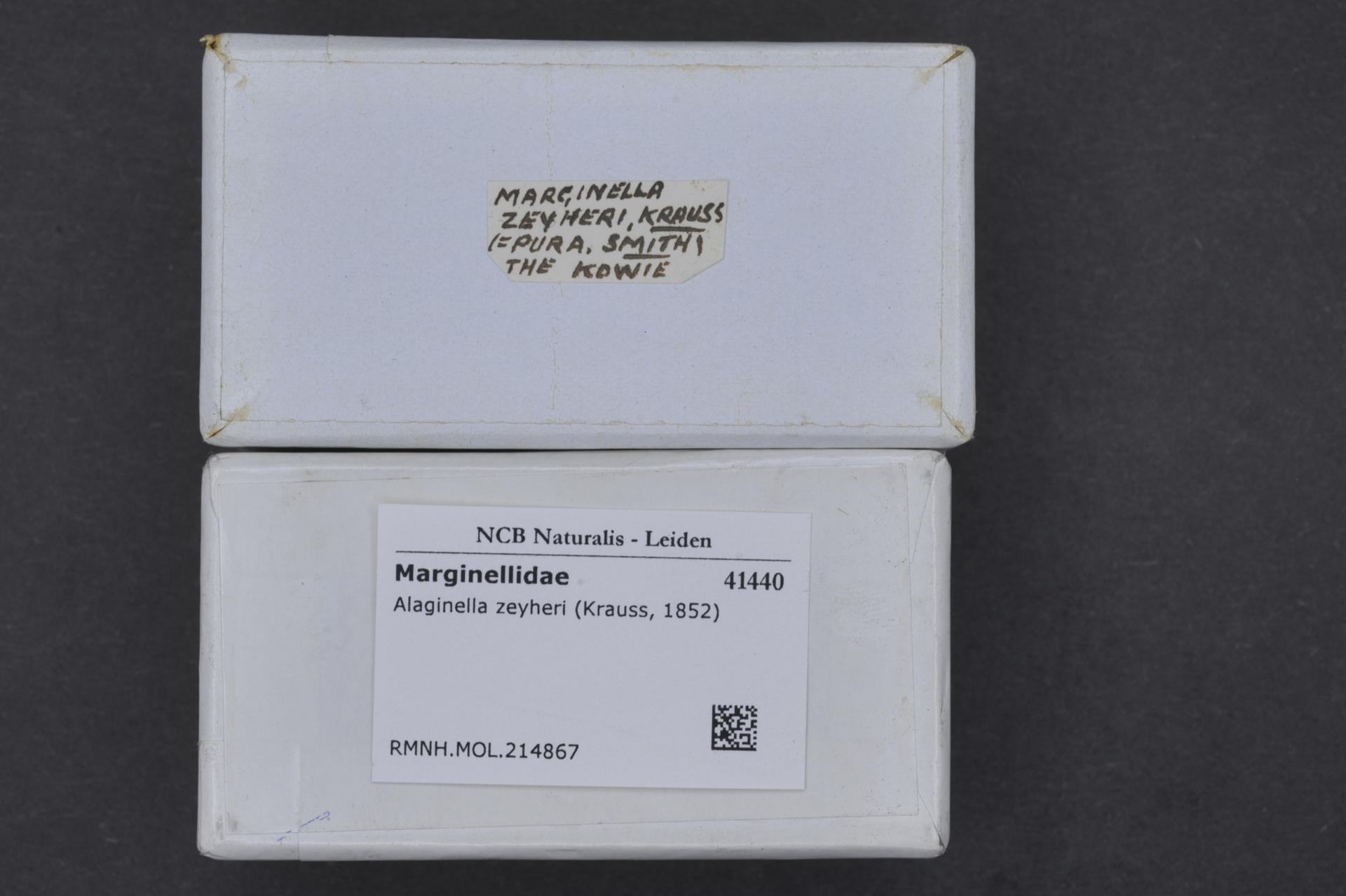

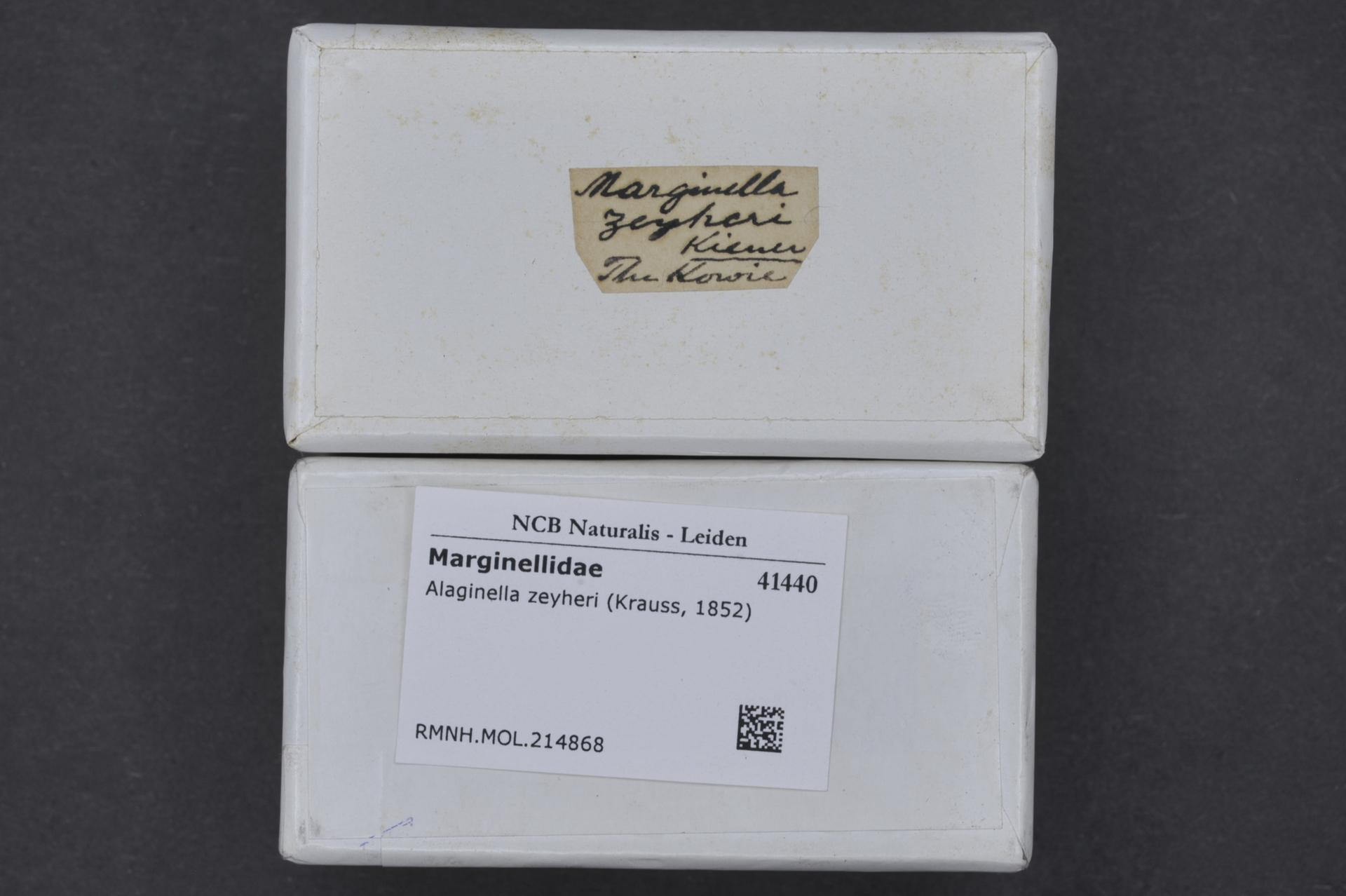
