= Alaginella aikeni =

Scientific classification
- Kingdom: Animalia
- Phylum: Mollusca
- Class: Gastropoda
- Subclass: Caenogastropoda
- Order: Neogastropoda
- Family: Marginellidae
- Genus: Alaginella
- Species: A. aikeni

Binomial name
- Alaginella aikeni Lussi, 2013

Species of gastropod

Alaginella aikeni is a species of sea snail, a marine gastropod mollusk in the family Marginellidae, the margin snails.

== Description ==
The length of the shell attains 2.8 mm.

== Distribution ==
This marine species occurs off the Eastern Cape, South Africa.
