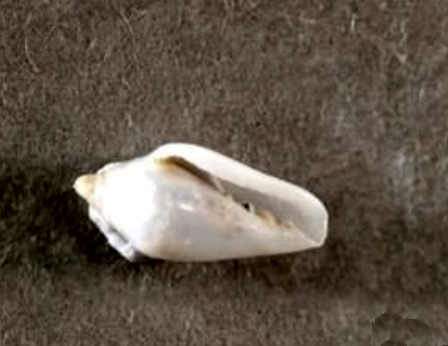
- Shell of Alaginella vercoi

Scientific classification
- Kingdom: Animalia
- Phylum: Mollusca
- Class: Gastropoda
- Subclass: Caenogastropoda
- Order: Neogastropoda
- Family: Marginellidae
- Genus: Alaginella
- Species: A. vercoi

Binomial name
- Alaginella vercoi (May, 1911)

Synonyms
- Alaginella sica (Cotton, 1949); Austroginella vercoi (May, 1911); Longinella everadensis Gabriel, 1962; Marginella everardensis (Gabriel, 1962); Marginella sica Cotton, 1949 ·; Marginella vercoi May, 1911 (original combination)

= Alaginella vercoi =

Species of gastropod

Alaginella vercoi is a species of sea snail, a marine gastropod mollusk in the family Marginellidae, the margin snails.

== Description ==
The length of the shell attains 5.5 mm, its diameter 3.5 mm.

(Original description) The shell is pyriform with broad shoulders, especially pronounced over the aperture, and features a prominent spire. It is pure white and shiny. The shell comprises five rounded whorls. The aperture is narrow, widening somewhat towards the squared anterior end. The outer lip is thick and nearly straight, bending well forward from the shoulder, and has about six denticles near the center of its length on the inner edge. The columella is somewhat excavated, bearing four folds: the first rises with a strong upward sweep from the base, while the others are less oblique, smaller, and more widely spaced as they ascend.

== Distribution ==
This marine species is endemic to Australia and occurs off South Australia, Tasmania, Victoria and Western Australia.
