= Alaginella borda =

Scientific classification
- Kingdom: Animalia
- Phylum: Mollusca
- Class: Gastropoda
- Subclass: Caenogastropoda
- Order: Neogastropoda
- Family: Marginellidae
- Genus: Alaginella
- Species: A. borda

Binomial name
- Alaginella borda (Cotton, 1944)

Synonyms
- Marginella borda Cotton, 1944 (original combination)

Species of gastropod

Alaginella borda is a species of sea snail, a marine gastropod mollusk in the family Marginellidae, the margin snails.

== Description ==
The length of the shell attains 4.25 mm, its diameter 2.75 mm.

== Distribution ==
This marine species is endemic to Australia and occurs off South Australia and Western Australia.
