= Alaginella waikohuensis =

Scientific classification
- Kingdom: Animalia
- Phylum: Mollusca
- Class: Gastropoda
- Subclass: Caenogastropoda
- Order: Neogastropoda
- Family: Marginellidae
- Genus: Alaginella
- Species: †A. waikohuensis

Binomial name
- †Alaginella waikohuensis (Marwick, 1931)

Synonyms
- † Marginella waikohuensis Marwick, 1931 (superseded combination)

Species of gastropod

Alaginella waikohuensis is an extinct species of sea snail, a marine gastropod mollusk in the family Marginellidae, the margin snails.

== Distribution ==
Fossils of this marine species were found in Tertiary strata in Gisborne District, New Zealand.
