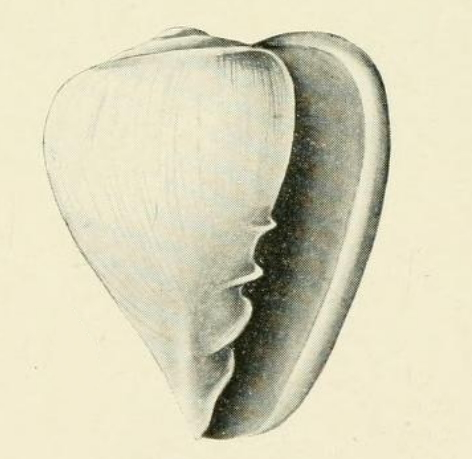
- Shell of Alaginella malina (holotype)

Scientific classification
- Kingdom: Animalia
- Phylum: Mollusca
- Class: Gastropoda
- Subclass: Caenogastropoda
- Order: Neogastropoda
- Family: Marginellidae
- Genus: Alaginella
- Species: A. malina

Binomial name
- Alaginella malina (Hedley, 1915)

Synonyms
- Marginella malina Hedley, 1915 (original combination); Triginella malina (Hedley, 1915); Triginella malinoides Gabriel, 1962 ·

= Alaginella malina =

Species of gastropod

Alaginella malina is a species of sea snail, a marine gastropod mollusk in the family Marginellidae, the margin snails.

== Description ==
The length of the shell attains 3.5 mm, its diameter 2.4 mm.

(Original description) The shell is small, rather thin, smooth, and glossy with a subtriangular outline. It has a rounded shoulder and an apex that slightly projects from a rather flat summit. Its color is uniformly white. The shell consists of three whorls wound nearly in the same plane. The aperture is straight, wide, and as long as the shell. The outer lip is broadly expanded. There are four narrow, erect plications on the columella, which become smaller and deeper posteriorly, with the last plication situated midway along the aperture. A slight glaze is present on the inner lip. The siphonal canal is slightly produced.

== Distribution ==
This marine species is endemic to Australia and occurs off New South Wales, Queensland, South Australia, Tasmania, Victoria.
