= Alaginella palla =

Scientific classification
- Kingdom: Animalia
- Phylum: Mollusca
- Class: Gastropoda
- Subclass: Caenogastropoda
- Order: Neogastropoda
- Family: Marginellidae
- Genus: Alaginella
- Species: †A. palla

Binomial name
- †Alaginella palla (Cotton, 1949)

Synonyms
- † Cassoginella palla (Cotton, 1949); † Marginella palla Cotton, 1949

Extinct species of gastropod

Alaginella palla is an extinct species of sea snail, a marine gastropod mollusk in the family Marginellidae, the margin snails.

== Distribution ==
Fossils of this marine species were found in South Australia, Australia.
