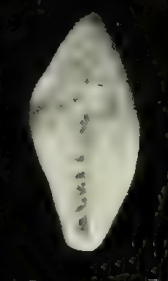
- Shell of † Alaginella fraudulenta (holotype)

Scientific classification
- Kingdom: Animalia
- Phylum: Mollusca
- Class: Gastropoda
- Subclass: Caenogastropoda
- Order: Neogastropoda
- Family: Marginellidae
- Genus: Alaginella
- Species: †A. fraudulenta

Binomial name
- †Alaginella fraudulenta (Suter, 1917)

Synonyms
- † Marginella (Glabella) fraudulenta Suter, 1917 (superseded combination); † Marginella fraudulenta Suter, 1917 (superseded combination)

= Alaginella fraudulenta =

Species of gastropod

Alaginella fraudulenta is an extinct species of sea snail, a marine gastropod mollusk in the family Marginellidae, the margin snails.

== Description ==
The length of the shell attains 4.5 mm, its diameter 2.5 mm.

(Original description): The shell is very small, ovate, and smooth with a moderately raised spire. The outer lip features a prominent smooth varix, and the columella has four oblique plaits. The shell lacks any sculptural details.

The conoidal spire has approximately half the height of the aperture, with a narrowly convex apex. The protoconch is broadly rounded with a minute, indistinct nucleus.

The shell contains three whorls in total. The spire whorls are small and slightly convex, while the body whorl is large, convex, and gradually narrows anteriorly. The suture is superficial and simple.

The aperture is oblique and narrow, with nearly parallel margins. It is slightly channeled above and truncated at the base. The outer lip is somewhat convex, featuring a strong varix that is smooth on the inside, extending a short way up the spire and around the base, with a distinct posterior sinus.

The columella is oblique, with four subequidistant sharp plaits. The two upper plaits are transverse, while the lower two are slightly closer together and oblique, with the lowest extending to the basal margin.

The inner lip is thin and rather broadly spread over the body.

== Distribution ==
Fossils of this marine species were found in Tertiary strata in New Zealand.
