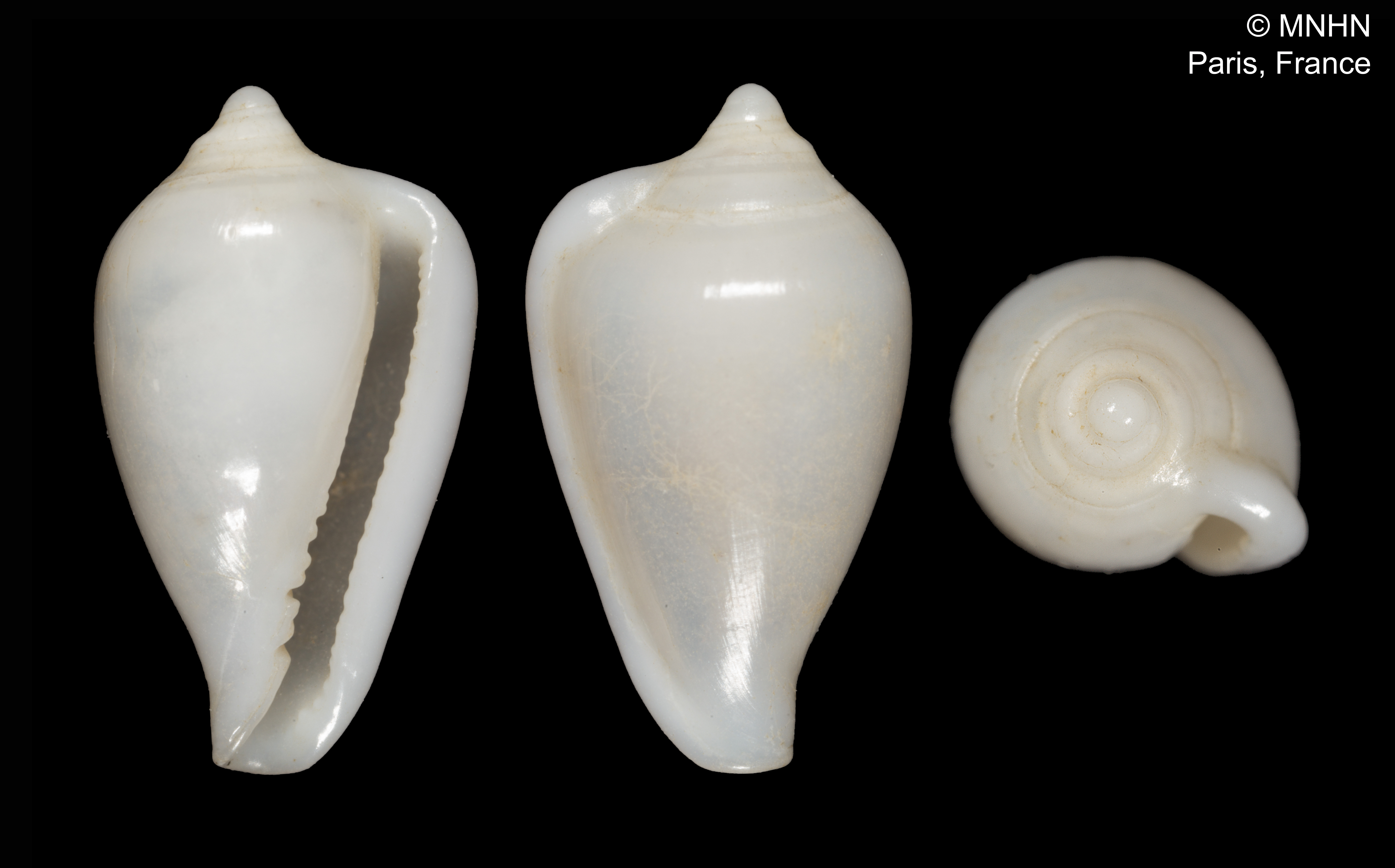
- Shell of Protoginella caledonica (holotype at MNHN, Paris)

Scientific classification
- Kingdom: Animalia
- Phylum: Mollusca
- Class: Gastropoda
- Subclass: Caenogastropoda
- Order: Neogastropoda
- Family: Marginellidae
- Genus: Protoginella
- Species: P. caledonica

Binomial name
- Protoginella caledonica Boyer, 2001

= Protoginella caledonica =

Species of gastropod

Protoginella caledonica is a species of sea snail, a marine gastropod mollusc in the family Marginellidae, the margin snails.

== Description ==
The length of the shell attains 7 to 8.35 mm.

== Distribution ==
This marine species occurs off New Caledonia.
