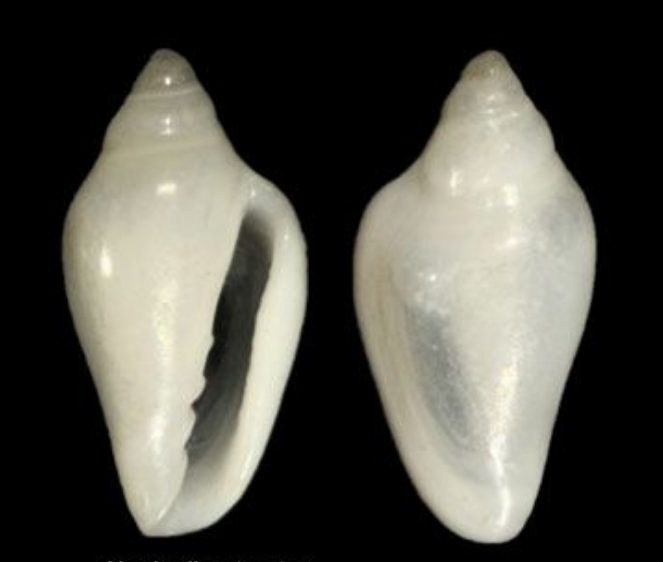
- Shell of Alaginella atractus (specimen in the Natural History Museum Rotterdam)

Scientific classification
- Kingdom: Animalia
- Phylum: Mollusca
- Class: Gastropoda
- Subclass: Caenogastropoda
- Order: Neogastropoda
- Family: Marginellidae
- Genus: Alaginella
- Species: A. atractus

Binomial name
- Alaginella atractus (Tomlin, 1918)

Synonyms
- Alaginella julia (Thiele, 1925); Marginella atractus Tomlin, 1918 (original combination); Marginella julia Thiele, 1925 (junior synonym); Marginella kowiensis W. H. Turton, 1932; Marginella paula Thiele, 1925 (junior synonym); Marginella zeyheri var. kowiensis W. H. Turton, 1932 (junior synonym); Volvarina julia (Thiele, 1925) (junior synonym); Volvarina paula (Thiele, 1925) (junior synonym)

= Alaginella atractus =

Species of gastropod

Alaginella atractus is a species of sea snail, a marine gastropod mollusk in the family Marginellidae, the margin snails.

== Description ==
The shell of Alaginella atractus reaches a length of up to 7.2 mm. The species is mainly identified by its distinctive, small shell. Its general morphology is typical of the Marginellidae family, with a smooth and glossy surface, an elongated-oval outline, and a high spire. The aperture is long and narrow, and the outer lip is somewhat thickened, reflecting family characteristics. This shell structure allows it to be distinguished readily in collections and marine studies.

== Distribution ==
This marine species are found in marine environments off the coast Port Alfred, South Africa.
