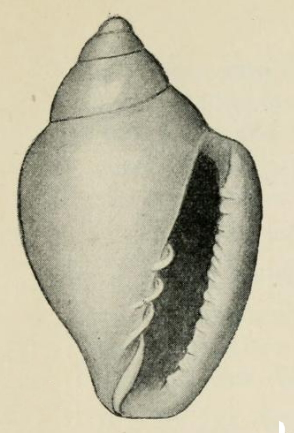
- Shell of Protoginella atkinsoni (holotype)

Scientific classification
- Kingdom: Animalia
- Phylum: Mollusca
- Class: Gastropoda
- Subclass: Caenogastropoda
- Order: Neogastropoda
- Family: Marginellidae
- Subfamily: Austroginellinae
- Genus: Protoginella
- Species: †P. atkinsoni

Binomial name
- †Protoginella atkinsoni (May, 1922)

Synonyms
- † Marginella atkinsoni May, 1922 † ·

= Protoginella atkinsoni =

Extinct species of gastropod

Protoginella atkinsoni is an extinct species of sea snail, a marine gastropod mollusk in the family Borsoniidae.

== Description ==
The length of the shell attains 5 mm, its diameter 3 mm.

(Original description) The smooth, white and shining shell is broadly fusiform. It contains four, much rounded whorls. The spire exsert, about one-third the length of the shell. The shell is broadly shouldered but tapering narrowly anteriorly. The aperture is rather narrow. The columella is slightly concave, bearing four strong plaits, the anterior one being almost vertical, the second less so, the upper two very transverse, the highest of all being at right angles to the columella. The outer lip is curved, very heavily thickened, crenulated on the inner edge by about a dozen rather irregular denticles.

== Distribution ==
This extinct marine species is endemic to Tasmania and were found in Tertiary strata.
