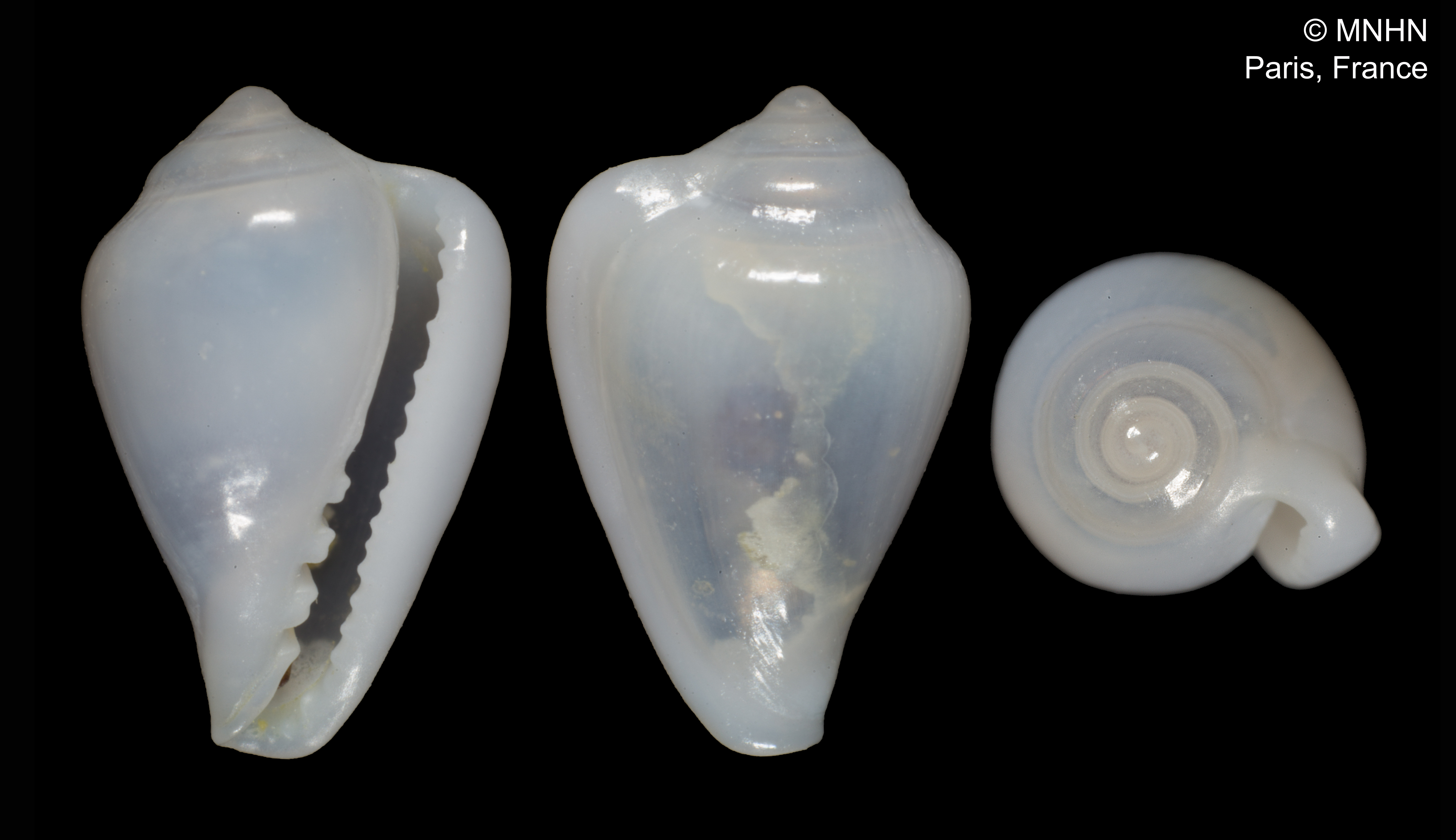
- Shell of Protoginella laseroni (holotype at MNHN, Paris)

Scientific classification
- Kingdom: Animalia
- Phylum: Mollusca
- Class: Gastropoda
- Subclass: Caenogastropoda
- Order: Neogastropoda
- Family: Marginellidae
- Genus: Protoginella
- Species: P. laseroni

Binomial name
- Protoginella laseroni Boyer, 2001

= Protoginella laseroni =

Species of gastropod

Protoginella laseroni is a species of sea snail, a marine gastropod mollusc in the family Marginellidae, the margin snails.

== Description ==
The length of the shell attains 5.55 mm.

== Distribution ==
This marine species occurs off New Caledonia.
