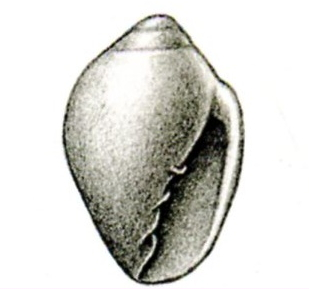
- Shell of Alaginella pemphix

Scientific classification
- Kingdom: Animalia
- Phylum: Mollusca
- Class: Gastropoda
- Subclass: Caenogastropoda
- Order: Neogastropoda
- Family: Marginellidae
- Genus: Alaginella
- Species: A. pemphix

Binomial name
- Alaginella pemphix (B. Roth, 1973)

Synonyms
- Marginella ovata Thiele, 1925 (invalid: junior homonym of Marginella ovata of Lee, 1833, Emmons, 1858 and Harris, 1897, Marginella pemphix B. Roth, 1973 is a replacement name); Marginella pemphix B. Roth, 1973 (replacement name for Marginella ovata Thiele, 1925 not Lea, 1833, Emmons, 1858 nor Harris, 1897)

= Alaginella pemphix =

Species of gastropod

Alaginella pemphix is a species of sea snail, a marine gastropod mollusk in the family Marginellidae, the margin snails.

== Distribution ==
This marine species occurs off East Africa.
