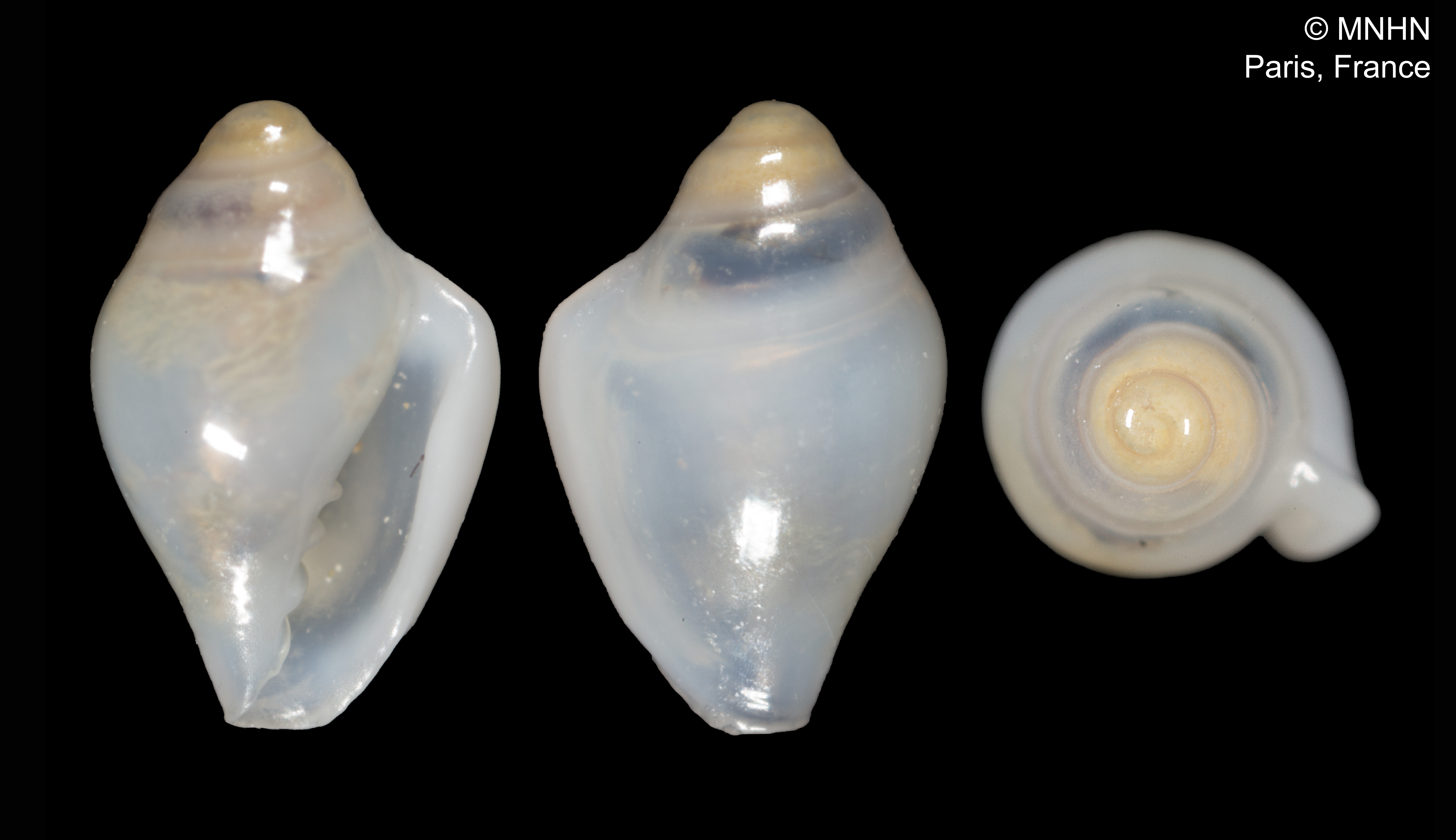
- Shell of Alaginella cottoni (holotype at MNHN, Paris)

Scientific classification
- Kingdom: Animalia
- Phylum: Mollusca
- Class: Gastropoda
- Subclass: Caenogastropoda
- Order: Neogastropoda
- Family: Marginellidae
- Genus: Alaginella
- Species: A. cottoni

Binomial name
- Alaginella cottoni Boyer, 2001

= Alaginella cottoni =

Species of gastropod

Alaginella cottoni is a species of sea snail, a marine gastropod mollusk in the family Marginellidae, the margin snails.

== Distribution ==
This marine species occurs off New Caledonia.
