= Alaginella clisia =

Scientific classification
- Kingdom: Animalia
- Phylum: Mollusca
- Class: Gastropoda
- Subclass: Caenogastropoda
- Order: Neogastropoda
- Family: Marginellidae
- Genus: Alaginella
- Species: †A. clisia

Binomial name
- †Alaginella clisia (Cotton, 1949)

Synonyms
- † Marginella clisia Cotton, 1949

Extinct species of gastropod

Alaginella clisia is an extinct species of sea snail, a marine gastropod mollusk in the family Marginellidae, the margin snails.

== Distribution ==
Fossils of this marine species were found in Victoria, Australia.
