= Alaginella parvisinus =

Scientific classification
- Kingdom: Animalia
- Phylum: Mollusca
- Class: Gastropoda
- Subclass: Caenogastropoda
- Order: Neogastropoda
- Family: Marginellidae
- Genus: Alaginella
- Species: †A. parvisinus

Binomial name
- †Alaginella parvisinus (P. A. Maxwell, 1992)

Synonyms
- † Protoginella (Alaginella) parvisinus P. A. Maxwell, 1992 (superseded combination); † Protoginella parvisinus P. A. Maxwell, 1992

Species of gastropod

Alaginella parvisinus is an extinct species of sea snail, a marine gastropod mollusk in the family Marginellidae, the margin snails.

== Distribution ==
Fossils of this marine species were found in Eocene strata in South Canterbury, New Zealand.
