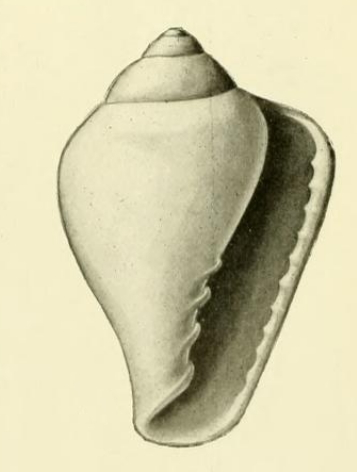
- Shell of Alaginella geminata (holotype)

Scientific classification
- Kingdom: Animalia
- Phylum: Mollusca
- Class: Gastropoda
- Subclass: Caenogastropoda
- Order: Neogastropoda
- Family: Marginellidae
- Genus: Alaginella
- Species: A. geminata

Binomial name
- Alaginella geminata (Hedley, 1912)

Synonyms
- Marginella geminata Hedley, 1912 (original combination); Marginella weedingi Cotton, 1944; Protoginella geminata (Hedley, 1912); Protoginella weedingi (Cotton, 1944)

= Alaginella geminata =

Species of gastropod

Alaginella geminata is a species of sea snail, a marine gastropod mollusk in the family Marginellidae, the margin snails.

== Description ==
The length of the shell attains 6 mm, its diameter 4 mm.

(Original description) The biconical shell is glossy, and solid, becoming opaque in maturity and thin and translucent in youth. Its color is uniformly white. It comprises four whorls that are flattened above the shoulder and contracted at the base. Upon maturity, the spire is covered with a callus sheet that obscures the sutures, while a thicker layer extends over the body whorl ahead of the aperture. The aperture is narrow, subrostrate anteriorly, and channeled posteriorly, ascending the previous whorl. The outer lip has a thick varix externally and approximately ten evenly spaced small denticles internally. The columella features four strong elevated folds, with the posterior fold being horizontal and situated about halfway along the aperture, and the anterior fold running into the margin of the subrostrate extremity.

== Distribution ==
This marine species is endemic to Australia and occurs off New South Wales, Queensland, South Australia, Tasmania, Victoria and Western Australia.
