= Alaginella labinensis =

Scientific classification
- Kingdom: Animalia
- Phylum: Mollusca
- Class: Gastropoda
- Subclass: Caenogastropoda
- Order: Neogastropoda
- Family: Marginellidae
- Genus: Alaginella
- Species: †A. labinensis

Binomial name
- †Alaginella labinensis (P. A. Maxwell, 1988)

Synonyms
- † Protoginella (Alaginella) labinensis P. A. Maxwell, 1988 (superseded combination); † Protoginella labinensis P. A. Maxwell, 1988 (superseded combination)

Species of gastropod

Alaginella labinensis is an extinct species of sea snail, a marine gastropod mollusk in the family Marginellidae, the margin snails.

== Distribution ==
Fossils of this marine species were found in Miocene strata in Westland, New Zealand.
