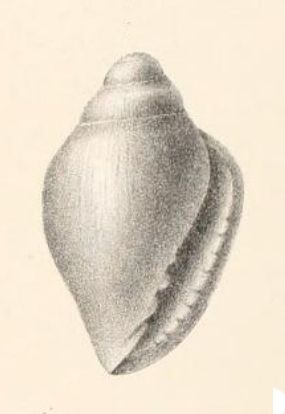
- Shell of Alaginella valida (holotype)

Scientific classification
- Kingdom: Animalia
- Phylum: Mollusca
- Class: Gastropoda
- Subclass: Caenogastropoda
- Order: Neogastropoda
- Family: Marginellidae
- Genus: Alaginella
- Species: A. valida

Binomial name
- Alaginella valida (R. B. Watson, 1886)

Synonyms
- Marginella (Glabella) valida R. B. Watson, 1886 superseded combination; Marginella valida R. B. Watson, 1886 superseded combination; Protoginella valida (R. B. Watson, 1886) superseded combination

= Alaginella valida =

Species of gastropod

Alaginella valida is a species of sea snail, a marine gastropod mollusk in the family Marginellidae, the margin snails.

== Description ==
The length of the shell attains 6 mm.

(Original description) Shell: small, gibbously biconical, and strong, with a lustrous, porcellanous white surface. It has a long, oblique, rather narrow aperture, a strongly varixed outer lip with faint teeth, and four folds on the columella.

Sculpture: the shell features faint and unequal lines of growth.

Color: lustrous, porcellanous white.

Spire: moderately raised and conical, with an excessively blunt and rounded apex.

Whorls: nearly five whorls, slightly convex above, bluntly rounded at the periphery, produced, and barely concave at the base. The suture is slightly impressed.

Aperture: long, narrow, and oblique, with a truncate front. The outer lip is not emarginate in front, though it is truncate. It ascends at the insertion, forming a wide, shallow sinus, and is convex in the middle. The outer lip has a strong varix and a blunt, rounded edge with faint denticles. The inner lip is not thickened, nearly straight but oblique to the axis. The lower half of its length is occupied by four broad but not very prominent oblique denticles, with the foremost forming a slight flange at the tip of the columella.

== Distribution ==
This marine species is endemic to Australia and occurs off Queensland.
