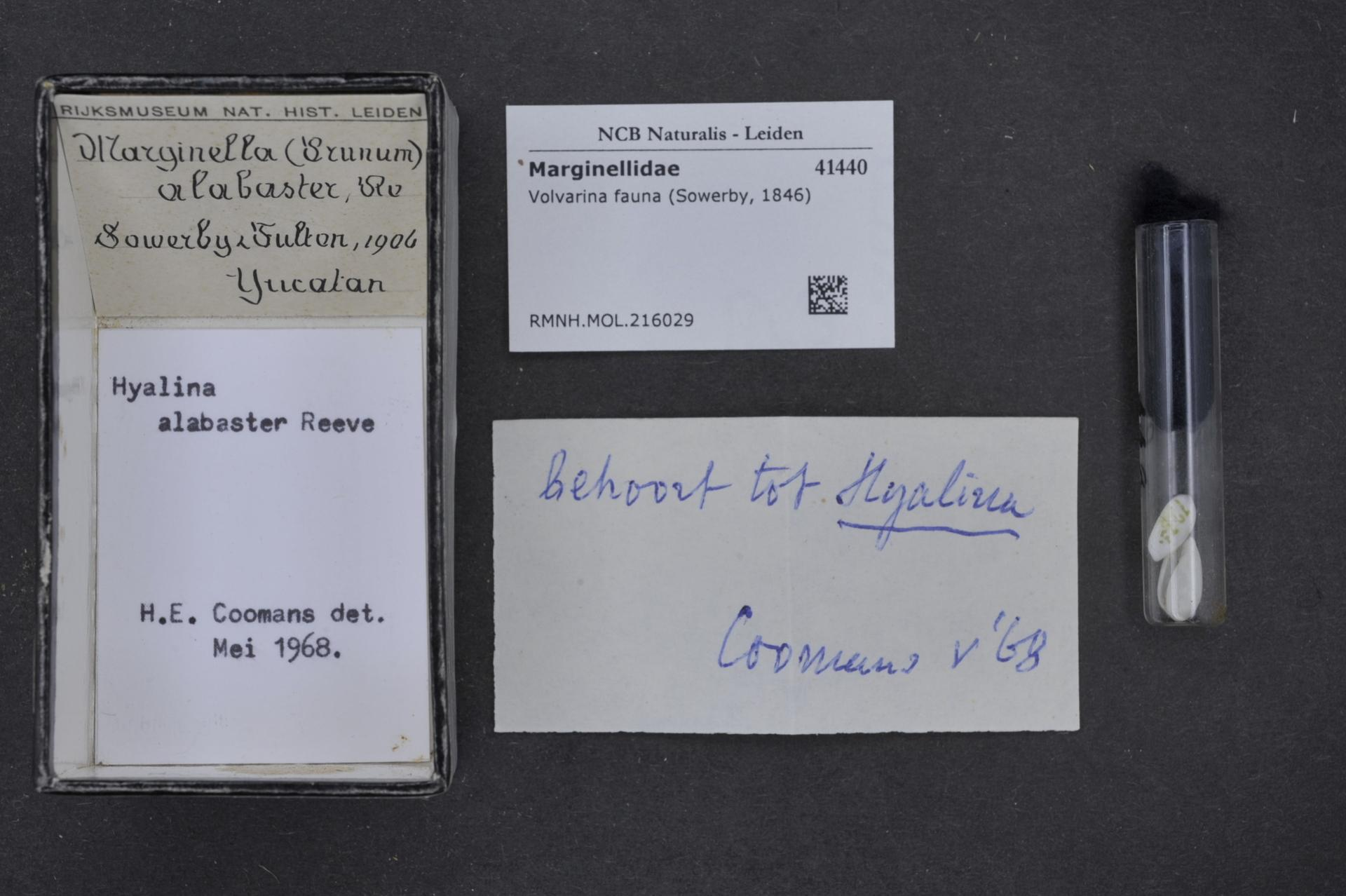

Scientific classification
- Kingdom: Animalia
- Phylum: Mollusca
- Class: Gastropoda
- Subclass: Caenogastropoda
- Order: Neogastropoda
- Family: Marginellidae
- Subfamily: Marginellinae
- Genus: Volvarina
- Species: V. fauna

Binomial name
- Volvarina fauna (G.B. Sowerby I, 1846)

Synonyms
- Marginella alabaster Reeve, 1865; Marginella fauna G. B. Sowerby I, 1846 (original combination); Marginella pellucida Weinkauff, 1879; Prunum alabaster (Reeve, 1865)

= Volvarina fauna =

Species of gastropod

Volvarina fauna, common name the alabaster marginella. is a species of sea snail, a marine gastropod mollusk in the family Marginellidae, the margin snails.

== Description ==
(Described as Marginella alabaster) The shell is cylindrically ovate, shining-white and rather opaque. The spire is short. The whorls are convex. The outer lip is somewhat thicker, flexuous and incurved in the middle. The columella is four-plaited.

== Distribution ==
This marine species occurs off Curaçao, Caribbean Sea.
