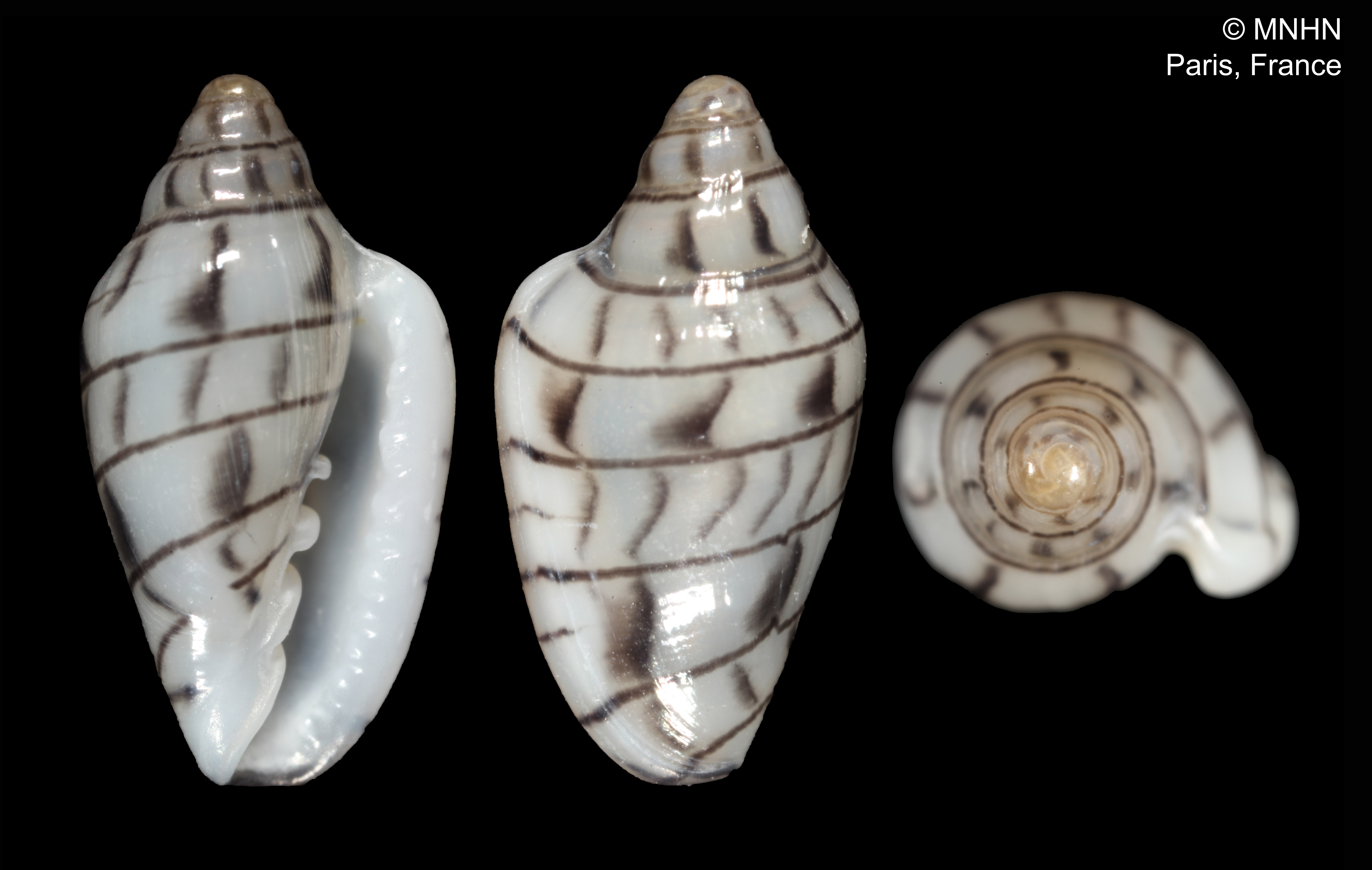
- Shell of Marginella mirandai (holotype at MNHN, Paris)

Scientific classification
- Kingdom: Animalia
- Phylum: Mollusca
- Class: Gastropoda
- Subclass: Caenogastropoda
- Order: Neogastropoda
- Family: Marginellidae
- Subfamily: Marginellinae
- Genus: Marginella
- Species: M. mirandai

Binomial name
- Marginella mirandai Rolán & Gori, 2014

Synonyms
- Marginella (Insulamarginella) mirandai Rolán & Gori, 2014· accepted, alternate representation

= Marginella mirandai =

Species of gastropod

Marginella mirandai is a species of sea snail, a marine gastropod mollusc in the family Marginellidae, the marginellids.

== Description ==
The shell attains a length of 6.7 mm.

== Distribution ==
This species occurs off and is endemic to São Tomé and Príncipe Islands in the Gulf of Guinea, West Africa.
