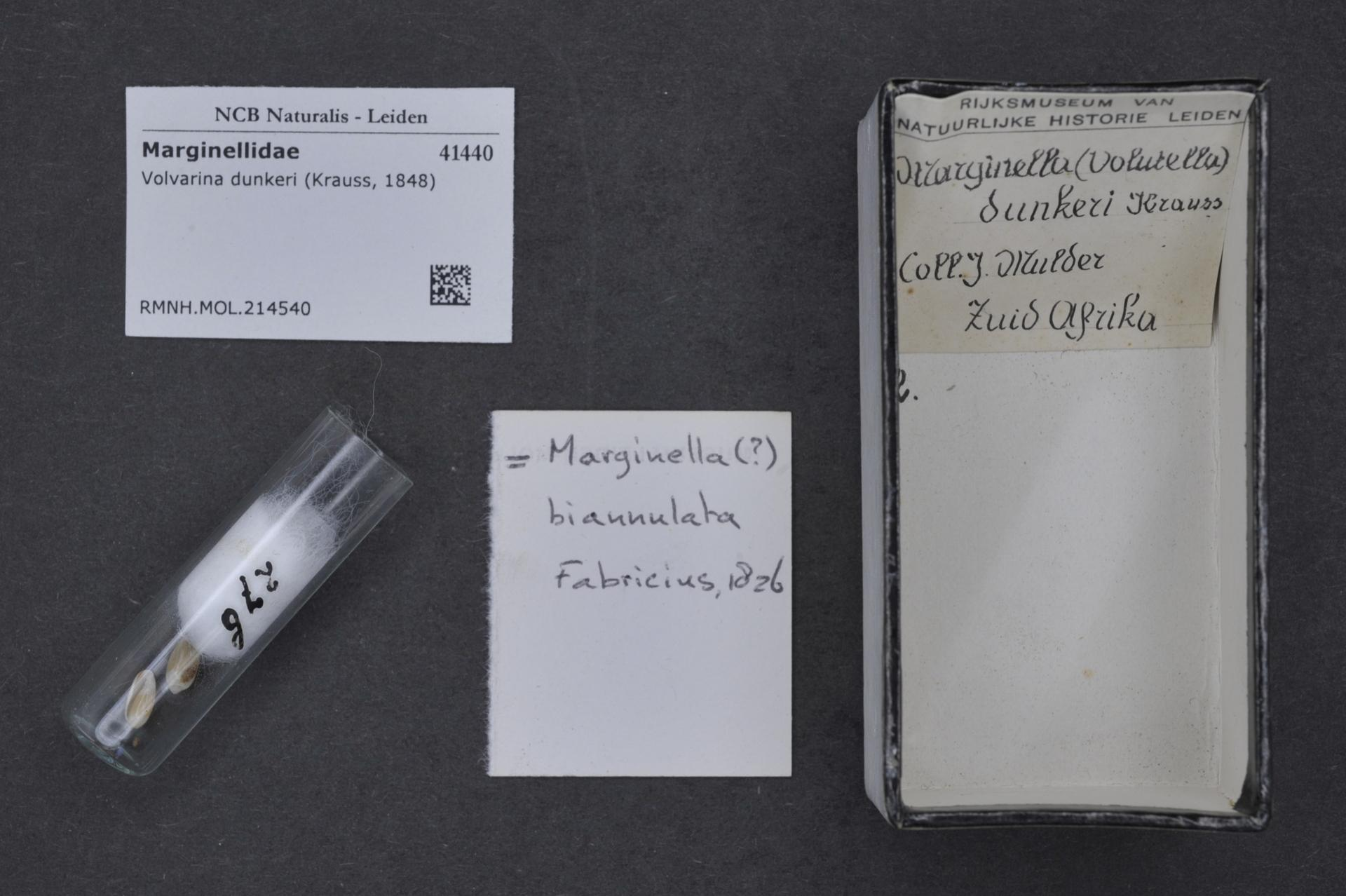
- Shell of Volvarina dunkeri (specimen at Naturalis Biodiversity Center)

Scientific classification
- Kingdom: Animalia
- Phylum: Mollusca
- Class: Gastropoda
- Subclass: Caenogastropoda
- Order: Neogastropoda
- Family: Marginellidae
- Subfamily: Marginellinae
- Genus: Volvarina
- Species: V. dunkeri

Binomial name
- Volvarina dunkeri (Krauss, 1848)

Synonyms
- Marginella dunkeri Krauss, 1848 (original combination); Volvarina dunkeri f. kraussi W. H. Turton, 1932 ·

= Volvarina dunkeri =

Species of gastropod

Volvarina dunkeri is a species of sea snail, a marine gastropod mollusk in the family Marginellidae, the margin snails.

== Description ==
The length of the shell attains 6 mm.

== Distribution ==
This marine species occurs off South Africa.
