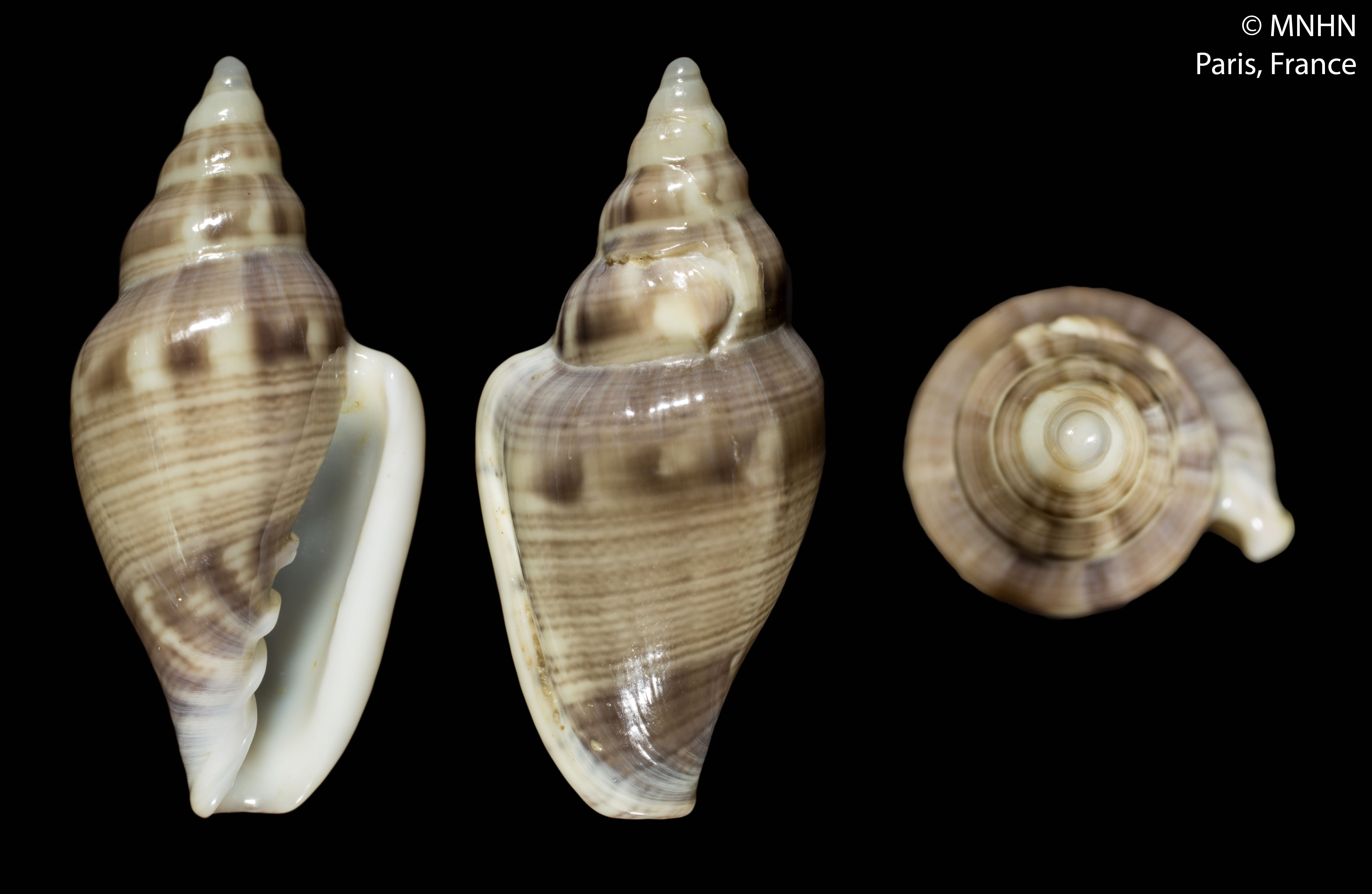
- Shell of Marginella emmae (holotype at MNHN, Paris)

Scientific classification
- Kingdom: Animalia
- Phylum: Mollusca
- Class: Gastropoda
- Subclass: Caenogastropoda
- Order: Neogastropoda
- Family: Marginellidae
- Genus: Marginella
- Species: M. emmae

Binomial name
- Marginella emmae Bozzetti, 1998

Synonyms
- Marginella (Somaliamarginella) emmae Bozzetti, 1988· accepted, alternate representation &display_parents= 3

= Marginella emmae =

Species of gastropod

Marginella emmae is a species of sea snail, a marine gastropod mollusk in the family Marginellidae, the margin snails.

== Description ==
Its dimensions are approximately 8.88 mm in length and 5.24 mm in width.

== Distribution ==
This marine species occurs off Somalia.
