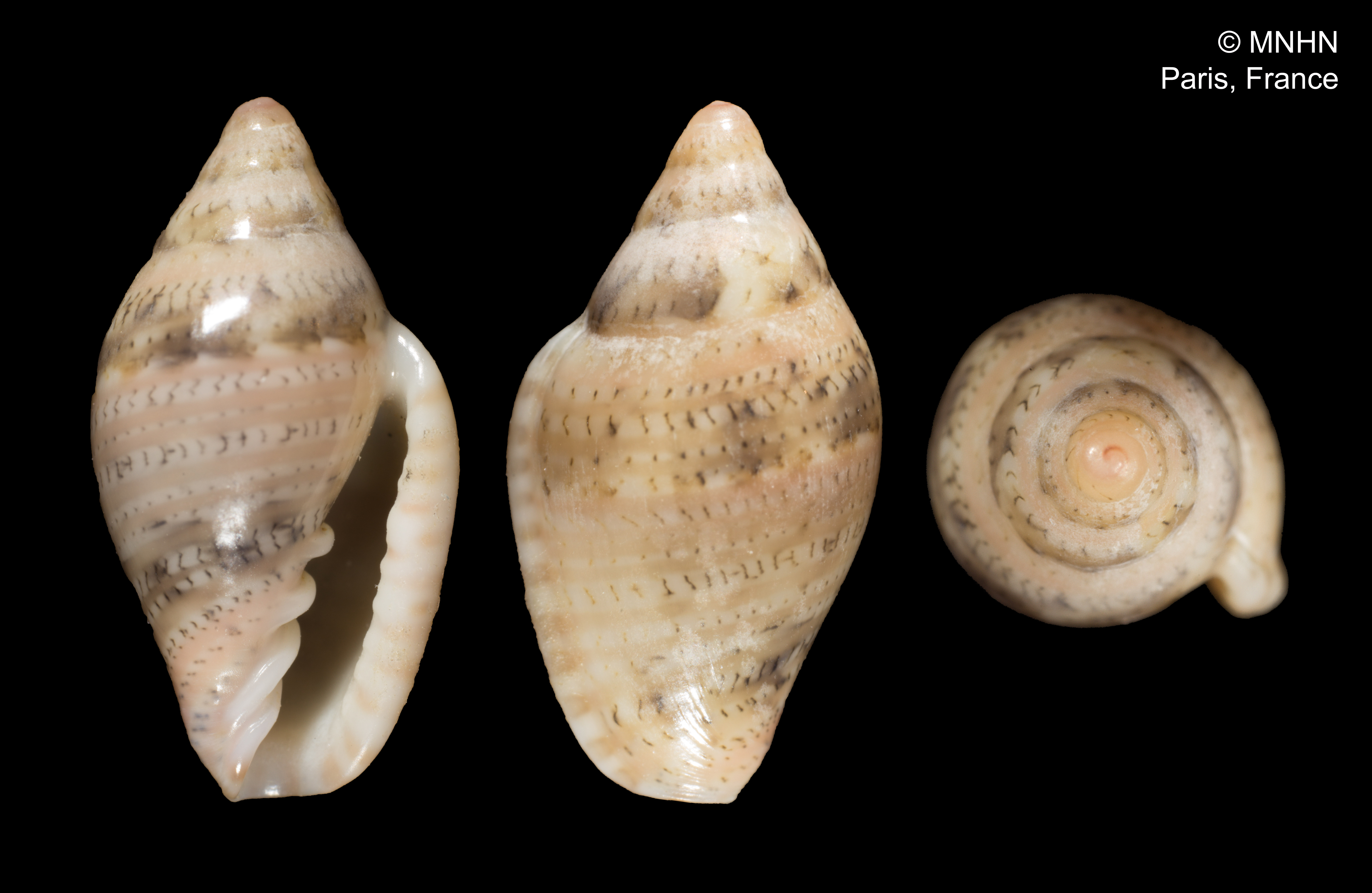
- Shell of Marginella luculenta (holotype at MNHN, Paris)

Scientific classification
- Kingdom: Animalia
- Phylum: Mollusca
- Class: Gastropoda
- Subclass: Caenogastropoda
- Order: Neogastropoda
- Family: Marginellidae
- Subfamily: Marginellinae
- Genus: Marginella
- Species: M. luculenta

Binomial name
- Marginella luculenta Gofas & Fernandes, 1994

Synonyms
- Marginella (Kaokomarginella) luculenta Gofas & F. Fernandes, 1994· accepted, alternate representation

= Marginella luculenta =

Species of gastropod

Marginella luculenta is a species of sea snail, a marine gastropod mollusk in the family Marginellidae, the margin snails.

== Distribution ==
This marine species occurs off Angola.
