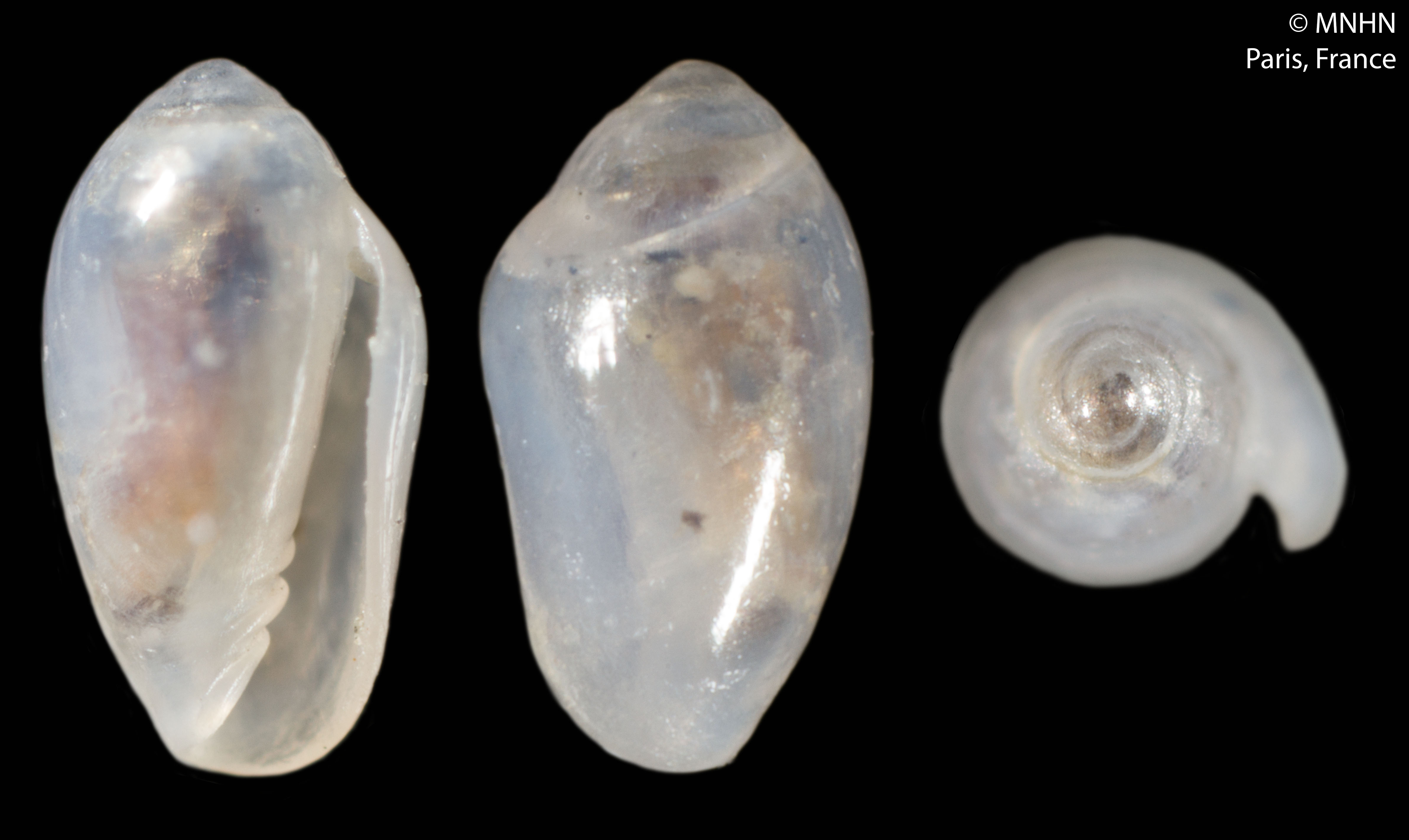
- Shell of Marginella gennesi (holotype at MNHN, Paris)

Scientific classification
- Kingdom: Animalia
- Phylum: Mollusca
- Class: Gastropoda
- Subclass: Caenogastropoda
- Order: Neogastropoda
- Family: Marginellidae
- Subfamily: Marginellinae
- Genus: Marginella
- Species: M. gennesi

Binomial name
- Marginella gennesi H. Fisher, 1901

= Marginella gennesi =

Species of gastropod

Marginella gennesi is a species of sea snail, a marine gastropod mollusk in the family Marginellidae, the margin snails.

== Description ==
The length of the shell attains 1.5 mm.

== Distribution ==
This species occurs in the Red Sea off Djibouti.
