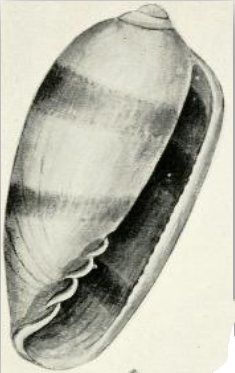
- Shell of Volvarina hedleyi (holotype)

Scientific classification
- Kingdom: Animalia
- Phylum: Mollusca
- Class: Gastropoda
- Subclass: Caenogastropoda
- Order: Neogastropoda
- Family: Marginellidae
- Subfamily: Marginellinae
- Genus: Volvarina
- Species: V. hedleyi

Binomial name
- Volvarina hedleyi (May, 1911)

Synonyms
- Marginella hedleyi May, 1911 (original combination)

= Volvarina hedleyi =

Species of gastropod

Volvarina hedleyi is a species of sea snail, a marine gastropod mollusk in the family Marginellidae, the margin snails.

== Description ==
The length of the shell attains 13 mm, its diameter 5.5 mm.

(Original description) The solid shell is cylindroid, with a distinct spire. It is yellowish white, with two distinct orange bands. The spire is obtuse and contains four whorls. The aperture is rather narrow and widening anteriorly. The outer lip is slightly thickened, and finely denticulate in the type Some specimens are, however, smooth in this respect. The columella is convexly curved, with four strong oblique plaits, and a tendency towards a fifth. The two orange colour bands divide the shell into three roughly equal divisions. These bands are always distinct without any shading or accessory bands or lines. There is also a patch of the same colour surrounding the anterior plaits.

== Distribution ==
This marine species is endemic to Australia and occurs off Tasmania.
