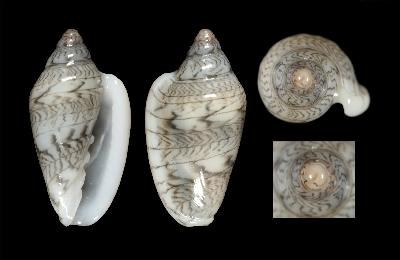
- Shell of Marginella hernandezi (holotype at MNHN, Paris)

Scientific classification
- Kingdom: Animalia
- Phylum: Mollusca
- Class: Gastropoda
- Subclass: Caenogastropoda
- Order: Neogastropoda
- Family: Marginellidae
- Subfamily: Marginellinae
- Genus: Marginella
- Species: M. hernandezi

Binomial name
- Marginella hernandezi Rolán & Gori, 2014

Synonyms
- Marginella (Insulamarginella) hernandezi Rolán & Gori, 2014· accepted, alternate representation

= Marginella hernandezi =

Species of gastropod

Marginella hernandezi is a species of sea snail, a marine gastropod mollusc in the family Marginellidae, the marginellids.

== Description ==
The length of the shell attains 9.4 mm.

The shell of the species has grey to black thin lines and its outer part ranges from white to grey.

== Distribution ==
This species occurs off and is endemic to São Tomé and Príncipe Islands, Gulf of Guinea, West Africa.
