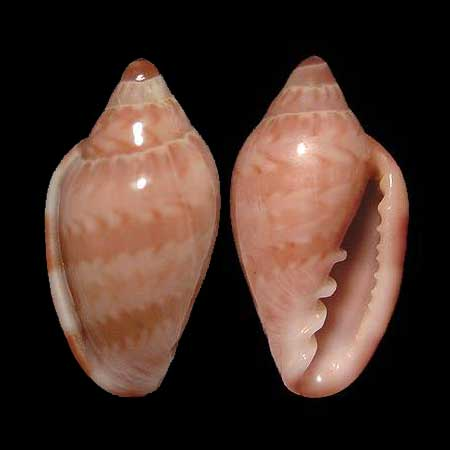
- Apertural (right) and abapertural (left) views of a shell of M. cloveri

Scientific classification
- Kingdom: Animalia
- Phylum: Mollusca
- Class: Gastropoda
- Subclass: Caenogastropoda
- Order: Neogastropoda
- Family: Marginellidae
- Genus: Marginella
- Species: M. cloveri

Binomial name
- Marginella cloveri Rios & Matthews, 1972

Synonyms
- Marginella moscatelli Boyer, 1997

= Marginella cloveri =

Species of gastropod

Marginella cloveri is a species of sea snail, a marine gastropod mollusk in the family Marginellidae, the margin snails.
