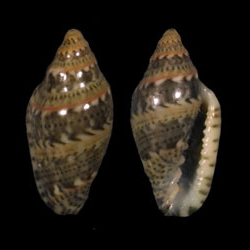
- Dorsal (left) and ventral (right) views of a shell of M. spinacia

Scientific classification
- Kingdom: Animalia
- Phylum: Mollusca
- Class: Gastropoda
- Subclass: Caenogastropoda
- Order: Neogastropoda
- Family: Marginellidae
- Subfamily: Marginellinae
- Genus: Marginella
- Species: M. spinacia

Binomial name
- Marginella spinacia Gofas & Fernandes, 1988

Synonyms
- Marginella (Insulamarginella) spinacia Gofas & F. Fernandes, 1988· accepted, alternate representation

= Marginella spinacia =

Species of gastropod

Marginella spinacia is a species of sea snail, a marine gastropod mollusk in the family Marginellidae, the margin snails.

== Description ==
The shell of Marginella spinacia is quite small, measuring around 6mm to 9mm. The external color of the shell is generally brown, with intricate patterns of red and white that follow the paucispiral's rim. The brown areas have horizontal symmetrical rows of dots, and/or vertical oscillating lines. The shell's outer lip is thickened and denticulate.

== Distribution ==
This species occurs in the Atlantic Ocean off São Tomé and Príncipe.
