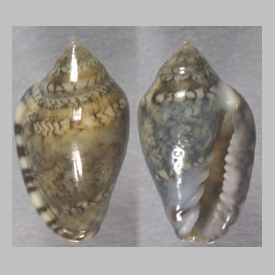
- Dorsal (left) and ventral (right) views of a shell of M. carquejai

Scientific classification
- Kingdom: Animalia
- Phylum: Mollusca
- Class: Gastropoda
- Subclass: Caenogastropoda
- Order: Neogastropoda
- Family: Marginellidae
- Subfamily: Marginellinae
- Genus: Marginella
- Species: M. carquejai

Binomial name
- Marginella carquejai Gofas & Fernandes, 1994

Synonyms
- Marginella (Kaokomarginella) carquejai Gofas & F. Fernandes, 1994· accepted, alternate representation; Marginella praiameliensis F. Fernandes & Alves, 1991 (original description printed but never distributed)

= Marginella carquejai =

Species of gastropod

Marginella carquejai is a species of sea snail, a marine gastropod mollusk in the family Marginellidae, the margin snails.

== Distribution ==
This marine species occurs off Angola.
