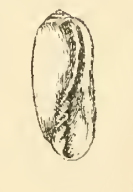
- Drawing of a shell of Volvarina compressa

Scientific classification
- Kingdom: Animalia
- Phylum: Mollusca
- Class: Gastropoda
- Subclass: Caenogastropoda
- Order: Neogastropoda
- Family: Marginellidae
- Subfamily: Marginellinae
- Genus: Volvarina
- Species: V. compressa

Binomial name
- Volvarina compressa (Reeve, 1865)

Synonyms
- Marginella compressa Reeve, 1865 ·

= Volvarina compressa =

Species of gastropod

Volvarina compressa, common name the compressed marginella, is a species of sea snail, a marine gastropod mollusk in the family Marginellidae, the margin snails.

== Description ==
The shell is cylindrically oblong, rather narrow, compressed in the middle, shining-white and glassy. The spire is small and obtuse. The outer lip is rather thickened, opaque. The columella is four-plaited.

== Distribution ==
This marine species occurs off Borneo, Indonesia.
