= Volvarina effulgens =

Scientific classification
- Kingdom: Animalia
- Phylum: Mollusca
- Class: Gastropoda
- Subclass: Caenogastropoda
- Order: Neogastropoda
- Family: Marginellidae
- Subfamily: Marginellinae
- Genus: Volvarina
- Species: V. effulgens

Binomial name
- Volvarina effulgens (Reeve, 1865)

Synonyms
- Marginella effulgens Reeve, 1865 ·

Species of gastropod

Volvarina effulgens, common name the glittering marginella, is a species of sea snail, a marine gastropod mollusk in the family Marginellidae, the margin snails.

== Description ==
The shell is oblong-cylindrical, semitransparent, shining, encircled with three rather broad, orange-brown bands. The outer lip is somewhat flexuous. The columella is four- plaited.

It is a bright, glossy, semitransparent shell, encircled with rather broad bands of colour.

== Distribution ==
This marine species occurs off Saint Thomas, U.S. Virgin Islands, Caribbean Sea.
