= Volvarina albescens =

Scientific classification
- Kingdom: Animalia
- Phylum: Mollusca
- Class: Gastropoda
- Subclass: Caenogastropoda
- Order: Neogastropoda
- Family: Marginellidae
- Subfamily: Marginellinae
- Genus: Volvarina
- Species: V. albescens

Binomial name
- Volvarina albescens (Hutton, 1873)

Synonyms
- Haloginella albescens (Hutton, 1873); Marginella albescens Hutton, 1873 (basionym); Serrata albescens (Hutton, 1873)

Species of gastropod

Volvarina albescens is a species of sea snail, a marine gastropod mollusk in the family Marginellidae, the margin snails.

== Description ==
The shell reaches a length of 5 millimetres (0.20 in) and a diameter of 2.5 millimetres (0.10 in). The shell is small, oval and translucent. The aperture is narrow. The columella shows four plaits. The shell is white with indications of two yellow bands.

== Distribution ==
This marine species is endemic to New Zealand.
