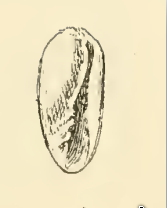
- Drawing of a shell of Volvarina affinis

Scientific classification
- Kingdom: Animalia
- Phylum: Mollusca
- Class: Gastropoda
- Subclass: Caenogastropoda
- Order: Neogastropoda
- Family: Marginellidae
- Subfamily: Marginellinae
- Genus: Volvarina
- Species: V. affinis

Binomial name
- Volvarina affinis (Reeve, 1865)

Synonyms
- Marginella affinis Reeve, 1865 ·

= Volvarina affinis =

Species of gastropod

Volvarina affinis, the allied marginella, is a species of sea snail, a marine gastropod mollusk in the family Marginellidae, the margin snails.

== Description ==
The shell is cylindrical, rounded at each end, transparent-white and rather solid. The spire is small. The outer lip is flexuous. The columella is four-plaited.
