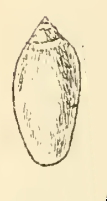
- Drawing of a shell of Volvarina bullula

Scientific classification
- Kingdom: Animalia
- Phylum: Mollusca
- Class: Gastropoda
- Subclass: Caenogastropoda
- Order: Neogastropoda
- Family: Marginellidae
- Subfamily: Marginellinae
- Genus: Volvarina
- Species: V. bullula

Binomial name
- Volvarina bullula (Reeve, 1865)

= Volvarina bullula =

Species of gastropod

Volvarina bullula, common name the little bubble marginella, is a species of sea snail, a marine gastropod mollusk in the family Marginellidae, the margin snails.

== Description ==
The shell is cylindrically oblong, transparent-white and glassy. The spire is obtusely conical. The outer lip is flexuous. The columella is four-plaited.

== Distribution ==
This marine species occurs off Borneo, Indonesia.
