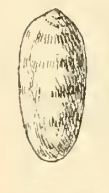
- Drawing of a shell of Volvarina obscura

Scientific classification
- Kingdom: Animalia
- Phylum: Mollusca
- Class: Gastropoda
- Subclass: Caenogastropoda
- Order: Neogastropoda
- Family: Marginellidae
- Genus: Volvarina
- Species: V. obscura

Binomial name
- Volvarina obscura Reeve, 1865

Synonyms
- Marginella obscura Reeve, 1865

= Volvarina obscura =

Species of gastropod

Volvarina obscura, common name the obscure marginella, is a species of sea snail, a marine gastropod mollusk in the family Marginellidae, the margin snails.

== Description ==
The shell is cylindncally oblong, reddish-white and shining. The spire is small. The outer lip is rather thick, faintly spotted with red and flexuous. The columella is four-plaited.

There is only a faint indication of colour in this species.
