= Volvarina isabelae =

Scientific classification
- Kingdom: Animalia
- Phylum: Mollusca
- Class: Gastropoda
- Subclass: Caenogastropoda
- Order: Neogastropoda
- Family: Marginellidae
- Subfamily: Marginellinae
- Genus: Volvarina
- Species: V. isabelae

Binomial name
- Volvarina isabelae (Borro, 1946)

Synonyms
- Marginella isabelae Borro, 1946 (original combination)

Species of gastropod

Volvarina isabelae is a species of sea snail, a marine gastropod mollusk in the family Marginellidae, the margin snails.

== Distribution ==
This marine species occurs off Cuba.
