= Volvarina jimcordyi =

Scientific classification
- Kingdom: Animalia
- Phylum: Mollusca
- Class: Gastropoda
- Subclass: Caenogastropoda
- Order: Neogastropoda
- Family: Marginellidae
- Genus: Volvarina
- Species: V. jimcordyi

Binomial name
- Volvarina jimcordyi Cossignani, 2007

Species of gastropod

Volvarina jimcordyi is a species of sea snail, a marine gastropod mollusk in the family Marginellidae, the margin snails.

== Description ==
Shell is very small, usually under 10mm in length, with dark amber-brown coloring. Shell is translucent. Adult shells have a thickened outer lip margin. Aperture is wider at the base (anterior-end) & spire is low.

== Distribution ==
Central Eleuthera Island, Bahamas.
