= Volvarina lipparinii =

Scientific classification
- Kingdom: Animalia
- Phylum: Mollusca
- Class: Gastropoda
- Subclass: Caenogastropoda
- Order: Neogastropoda
- Family: Marginellidae
- Genus: Volvarina
- Species: V. lipparinii

Binomial name
- Volvarina lipparinii T. Cossignani & Lorenz, 2020

Species of gastropod

Volvarina lipparinii is a species of sea snail, a marine gastropod mollusk in the family Marginellidae, the margin snails.

== Distribution ==
This marine species occurs off the Philippines.
