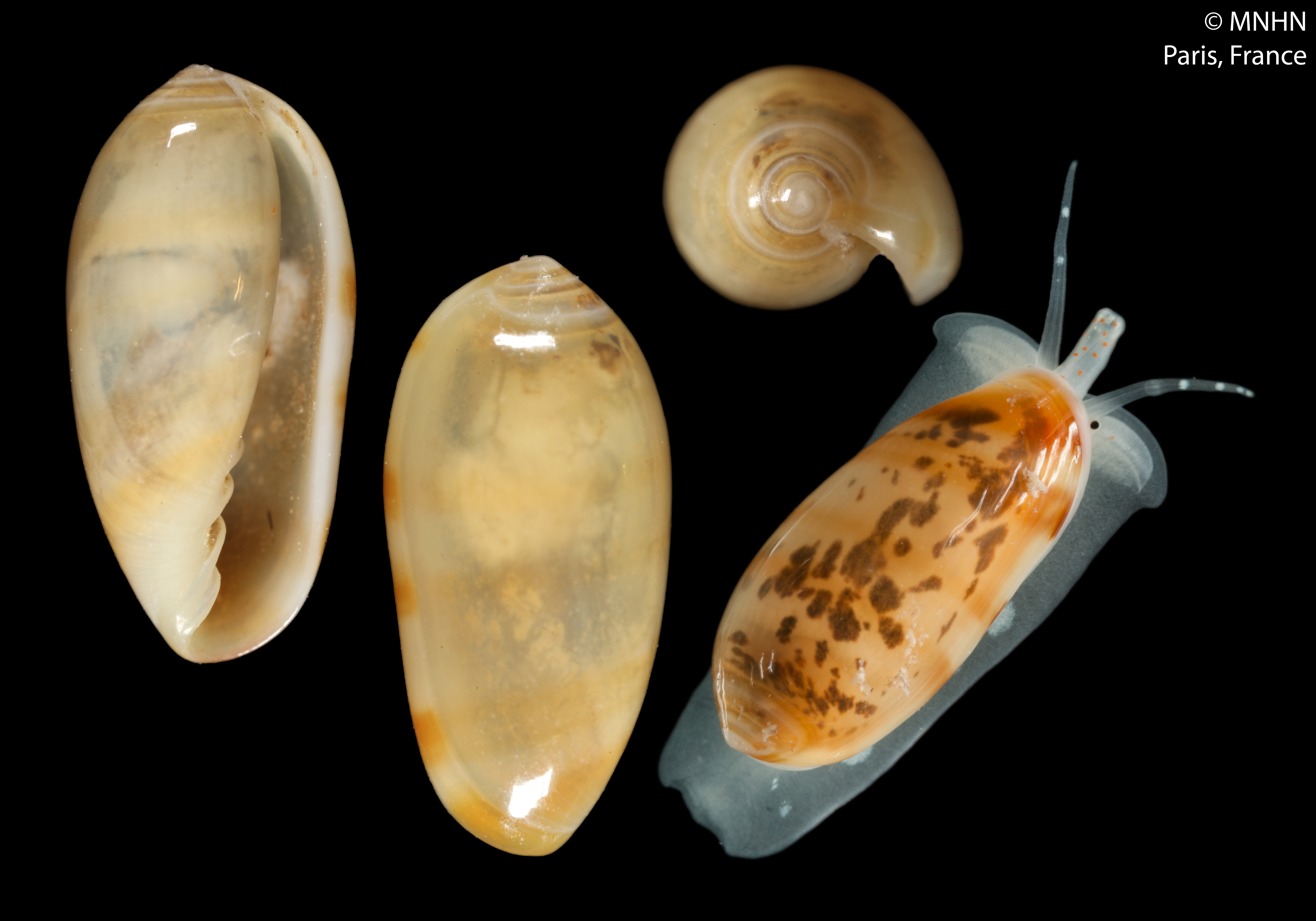
- The shell and animal of Volvarina virginieae (holotype at MNHN, Paris)

Scientific classification
- Kingdom: Animalia
- Phylum: Mollusca
- Class: Gastropoda
- Subclass: Caenogastropoda
- Order: Neogastropoda
- Family: Marginellidae
- Subfamily: Marginellinae
- Genus: Volvarina; Hinds, 1844

Type species
- Marginella nitida Hinds, 1844

Synonyms
- Hyalina (Volvarina); Marginella (Volvarina) Hinds, 1844; Volvarina (Atlantivolva) Ortea, 2014· accepted, alternate representation; Volvarina (Carivolva) Ortea, 2014· accepted, alternate representation; Volvarina (Creolina) Ortea, 2019· accepted, alternate representation; Volvarina (Ctenoina) Ortea, 2014· accepted, alternate representation; Volvarina (Duplivolva) Ortea, 2014· accepted, alternate representation; Volvarina (Remivolva) Ortea, 2014· accepted, alternate representation; Volvarina (Tridentina) Ortea, 2014· accepted, alternate representation

= Volvarina =

Genus of gastropods

Volvarina is a genus of small to very small sea snails, marine gastropod molluscs in the family Marginellidae, also known as the margin shells.

== Taxonomy ==
The difference between the genera Volvarina and Prunum is not clearly delineated and is based on morphological differences in the shells. Larger species with a strong callus are classified under Prunum, while the slender species with a thin callus are classified under Volvarina. Many species with characteristics that fall between the two extremes are ambiguous. Until at least 2010 there was no phylogenetic analysis to substantiate this classification. Volvarina is paraphyletic in relation to Prunum and Hyalina. Their status remains uncertain.

== Description ==
The smooth or glossy shells are very small, with a conical or cylindrical shape. The spire is usually low or sometimes slightly elevated. The anal sinus is absent. The outer lip is smooth or slightly incrassate. The inner lip shows three of four plaits; some species show a weaker fifth or sixth fold. They occupy about half the length of the aperture.

== Distribution ==
The genus is cosmopolitan with most species in warm and temperate seas.

== Species ==
Species within the genus Volvarina include:

- Volvarina abbreviata (C. B. Adams, 1850)
- Volvarina abdieli Espinosa, Ortea & Diez, 2015
- Volvarina adela (Thiele, 1925)
- Volvarina adrianadiae Cossignani, 2006
- Volvarina aethrae Espinosa & Ortea, 2015
- Volvarina affinis (Reeve, 1865)
- Volvarina agata (Laseron, 1957)
- Volvarina agatha (Laseron 1957)
- Volvarina aglae Espinosa & Ortea, 2015
- Volvarina aladunniae Ortea, 2014
- Volvarina alamarensis Espinosa & Ortea, 2013
- Volvarina alayoi Espinosa, Ortea & Diez, 2015
- Volvarina alayoni Espinosa & Ortea, 2015
- Volvarina albescens (Hutton, 1873)
- Volvarina albolineata (d'Orbigny, 1842), white-line marginella
- Volvarina alcoladoi Espinosa & Ortea, 1998
- Volvarina aldeynzeri Cossignani, 2005
- Volvarina alejandroi Espinosa, Ortea & Moro, 2009
- Volvarina algazaliae Ortea, 2014
- Volvarina aliceae Espinosa & Ortea, 2012
- Volvarina alloginella Espinosa, Moro & Ortea, 2011
- Volvarina ameliensis (Tomlin, 1917)
- Volvarina ampelusica Monterosato, 1906
- Volvarina amphitrite Espinosa & Ortea, 2015
- Volvarina anamariae Espinosa & Ortea, 2015
- Volvarina anao Espinosa & Ortea, 2012
- Volvarina andyi Espinosa & Ortea, 2013
- Volvarina angelae Espinosa, Soto [Vázquez] & Ortea, 2022
- Volvarina angolensis (Odhner, 1923)
- Volvarina angustata (G.B. Sowerby II, 1846)
- Volvarina anjatheilae T. Cossignani & Lorenz, 2018
- Volvarina arabica Boyer, 2015
- Volvarina ardovinii Cossignani, 1997
- Volvarina ariadnae Espinosa & Ortea, 2015
- Volvarina armonica Cossignani, 1997
- Volvarina arrecifensis Espinosa, Ortea & Moro, 2013
- Volvarina artemisae Espinosa & Ortea, 2013
- Volvarina artilesi Espinosa, Ortea & Moro, 2014
- Volvarina atabey Espinosa, Ortea & Moro, 2009
- Volvarina attenuata (Reeve, 1865)
- Volvarina augerea Laseron, 1957
- Volvarina avena (Kiener, 1834), orange-band marginella
- Volvarina avenella (Dall, 1881)
- Volvarina avesensis Caballer, Espinosa & Ortea, 2013
- Volvarina bacona Espinosa, Ortea & Diez, 2012
- Volvarina baenai Espinosa & Ortea, 2003
- Volvarina banesensis Espinosa & Ortea, 1999
- Volvarina barbierorum T. Cossignani & Lorenz, 2020
- Volvarina barbosae Ortea, 2014
- Volvarina barbuyae Ortea, 2014
- Volvarina bavecchii Cossignani, 2006
- Volvarina bayeri Gracia & Boyer, 2004
- Volvarina bazini Jousseaume, 1875
- Volvarina beatrix T. Cossignani & Lorenz, 2019
- Volvarina bellamatancera Espinosa & Ortea, 2015
- † Volvarina berauensis (Beets, 1941)
- Volvarina bernardoi Espinosa, Ortea & Diez, 2015
- Volvarina bessei Boyer, 2001
- Volvarina betyae Espinosa & Ortea, 1998
- Volvarina bevdeynzerae Cossignani, 2005
- Volvarina beyerleana (Bernardi, 1853)
- Volvarina bifurcata Boyer, 2015
- Volvarina borinquensis Espinosa & Ortea, 2015
- Volvarina borroi (Espinosa & Ortea, 1998)
- Volvarina boucheti Espinosa & Ortea, 2012
- Volvarina bouhamedae Ortea, 2014
- † Volvarina bouryi (Cossmann, 1889)
- Volvarina boyeri Moreno & Burnay, 1999
- Volvarina brasiliana Boyer, 2000
- Volvarina bravoae Ortea, 2014
- Volvarina brucebrandti T. Cossignani & Lorenz, 2019
- Volvarina brunoi Espinosa & Ortea, 2013
- Volvarina buenavistaensis Espinosa, Moro & Ortea, 2011
- Volvarina bullula (Reeve, 1865)
- Volvarina caballeri Espinosa & Ortea, 2012
- Volvarina cachoi Espinosa & Ortea, 1997
- Volvarina calliopeae Espinosa & Ortea, 2015
- Volvarina callypsoe Espinosa & Ortea, 2015
- Volvarina candida T. Cossignani & Lorenz, 2019
- Volvarina caonabae Espinosa, Ortea & Moro, 2010
- Volvarina caprina Espinosa & Ortea, 2015
- Volvarina caprottii T. Cossignani & Lorenz, 2019
- Volvarina caribetica Espinosa, Ortea & Magaña, 2018
- Volvarina carmelae Espinosa & Ortea, 1998
- Volvarina casiguaya Espinosa, Ortea & Diez, 2015
- Volvarina ceciliae Espinosa & Ortea, 1999
- Volvarina cernita (Locard, 1897)
- Volvarina charbarensis (Melvill, 1897)
- Volvarina charretonae Ortea, 2014
- Volvarina cienaguera Espinosa, Ortea & Moro, 2010
- Volvarina cienfueguera Espinosa, Ortea & Diez, 2015
- Volvarina cingalica Boyer, 2015
- Volvarina columba Espinosa, Moro & Ortea, 2011
- Volvarina compressa (Reeve, 1865)
- Volvarina confitesensis Espinosa, Ortea & Moro, 2010
- Volvarina consalvoi T. Cossignani & Lorenz, 2020
- Volvarina corallina (Bavay, 1910)
- Volvarina cordyorum Cossignani, 2009
- Volvarina corusca (Reeve, 1865)
- Volvarina criolla Espinosa & Ortea, 2003
- Volvarina cubana Espinosa & Ortea, 2015
- Volvarina curazaoensis Espinosa & Ortea, 2013
- Volvarina cybelesae Espinosa & Ortea, 2015
- † Volvarina cylindracea (Deshayes, 1865)
- Volvarina dalli Wakefield & McCleery, 2005
- Volvarina damasoi T. Cossignani, 2017
- Volvarina danielleae Espinosa & Ortea, 2012
- Volvarina davidi Espinosa, Ortea & Diez, 2015
- Volvarina dawnae Lussi & G. Smith, 1996
- Volvarina dekkeri Boyer & Renda, 2021
- Volvarina delanoisi T. Cossignani & Lorenz, 2018
- Volvarina deliciosa (Bavay in Dautzenberg, 1912)
- † Volvarina deningeri (P. J. Fischer, 1927)
- Volvarina denizi Espinosa, Ortea & Pérez-Dionis, 2014
- Volvarina dennisi Espinosa, Ortea & Diez, 2015
- Volvarina dhofarensis Boyer, 2015
- Volvarina diminuta Laseron, 1957
- Volvarina dinisioi (T. Cossignani, 2006)
- Volvarina dirbergi Espinosa & Ortea, 2012
- Volvarina dorisae Espinosa & Ortea, 2015
- Volvarina dozei (Rochebrune & Mabille, 1889)
- Volvarina dulcemariae Espinosa & Ortea, 1998
- Volvarina dunkeri (Krauss, 1848)
- Volvarina ealesae (Powell, 1958)
- Volvarina effulgens (Reeve, 1865)
- Volvarina elgoyhenae Ortea, 2014
- Volvarina elliptica (Redfield, 1870)
- Volvarina elridiae Ortea, 2014
- Volvarina elsayedae Ortea, 2014
- Volvarina enrici Espinosa, J. Martin & Ortea, 2018
- Volvarina enriquei Espinosa & Ortea, 1998
- Volvarina eratoae Espinosa & Ortea, 2013
- Volvarina ericmonnieri T. Cossignani, 2018
- Volvarina eumorpha (Melvill, 1906)
- † Volvarina eurychilus (Cossmann, 1892)
- Volvarina evanida (G.B. Sowerby II, 1846)
- Volvarina exilis (Gmelin, 1791)
- Volvarina falusiae Ortea, 2014
- Volvarina fanabeensis Espinosa, Ortea & Pérez-Dionis, 2014
- Volvarina farrantae Ortea, 2014
- Volvarina fasciata Lussi & Smith, 1996
- Volvarina fauna (G.B. Sowerby I, 1846)
- Volvarina ficoi Espinosa & Ortea, 2003
- Volvarina fifi Espinosa & Ortea, 2015
- Volvarina flamenca Espinosa, Moro & Ortea, 2011
- Volvarina florenceae Espinosa & Ortea, 2012
- Volvarina floresensis Espinosa & Ortea, 1999
- Volvarina fortunata Clover & Macca, 1990
- Volvarina francescoi T. Cossignani & Lorenz, 2018
- Volvarina franciscae Espinosa, Moro & Ortea, 2011
- Volvarina fraserorum T. Cossignani & Lorenz, 2020
- Volvarina frazzinii Cossignani, 2006
- Volvarina fugax Gofas & Fernandes, 1992
- Volvarina fulgida (Lussi & G. Smith, 1999)
- Volvarina gabriellae T. Cossignani, 2020
- Volvarina gargalloae Ortea, 2014
- Volvarina garycooverti Espinosa & Ortea, 1998
- Volvarina gemma Espinosa & Ortea, 2015
- Volvarina gianmariacannarai T. Cossignani & Lorenz, 2019
- Volvarina ginae Espinosa & Ortea, 2003
- Volvarina giraldilla Espinosa & Ortea, 2013
- † Volvarina gouetensis Le Renard & van Nieulande, 1985
- Volvarina gracilis (C.B. Adams, 1851)
- Volvarina granmaense Espinosa, Ortea & Diez, 2017
- Volvarina grosi Espinosa & Ortea, 2012
- Volvarina guajira Espinosa & Ortea, 1998
- Volvarina guamaense Espinosa, Ortea & Diez, 2015
- Volvarina guantanamera Espinosa, Moro & Ortea, 2011
- Volvarina guribae Ortea, 2014
- Volvarina habanera Espinosa & Ortea, 1997
- Volvarina haswelli Laseron, 1948
- Volvarina hedleyi (May 1911)
- Volvarina helenae Espinosa & Ortea, 2003
- Volvarina hemingwayi Espinosa & Ortea, 2015
- Volvarina hennequini Boyer, 2001
- Volvarina heterozona Jousseaume, 1875
- Volvarina hirasei (Bavay, 1917)
- Volvarina holguinera Espinosa, Ortea & Diez, 2015
- Volvarina humboldtiana Espinosa, Ortea & Diez, 2015
- Volvarina ibarrae Espinosa & Ortea, 1998
- † Volvarina incommoda Ludbrook, 1958
- Volvarina indica Bozzetti, 2019
- Volvarina infans Laseron, 1957
- Volvarina ingloria (E. A. Smith, 1910)
- Volvarina ingolfi Bouchet & Waren, 1985
- Volvarina innexa Roth, 1978
- Volvarina insulana Gofas & Fernandes, 1988
- Volvarina ireneae Espinosa & Ortea, 2015
- Volvarina irisae Espinosa & Ortea, 2015
- Volvarina isabelae (Borro, 1946)
- Volvarina ivic Caballer, Espinosa & Ortea, 2009
- Volvarina ixchelae Espinosa & Ortea, 2015
- Volvarina jaguanensis Espinosa & Ortea, 1998
- Volvarina janneefsi Bozzetti, 1997
- Volvarina jibara Espinosa, Ortea & Diez, 2017
- Volvarina jimcordyi Cossignani, 2007
- Volvarina jordani Espinosa, Ortea & Moro, 2014
- Volvarina josieae Espinosa & Ortea, 2012
- Volvarina joubini (Dautzenberg & Fischer, 1906)
- Volvarina juancarlosi Espinosa, Ortea & Diez, 2015
- Volvarina juangarciai Espinosa & Ortea, 2013
- Volvarina juanitae Espinosa, Ortea & Moro, 2013
- Volvarina juanjoi Espinosa & Ortea, 1998
- Volvarina judymontae T. Cossignani & Lorenz, 2018
- Volvarina juraguaense Espinosa, Ortea & Diez, 2015
- Volvarina keppelensis Laseron, 1957
- Volvarina kharafiae Ortea, 2014
- Volvarina kidwelli Lussi & Smith, 1996
- Volvarina kilwaensis Boyer, 2015
- Volvarina koillerae Ortea, 2014
- Volvarina kratzschorum T. Cossignani & Lorenz, 2019
- Volvarina kyprisae Espinosa, Ortea & Moro, 2013
- Volvarina laciniatalabrum Lussi & Smith, 1996
- Volvarina laetitia (Thiele, 1925)
- Volvarina lakhdarae Ortea, 2014
- Volvarina lamyi Espinosa & Ortea, 2012
- Volvarina larramendii Espinosa, Ortea & Diez, 2015
- Volvarina latortuga Caballer, Espinosa & Ortea, 2009
- Volvarina laurauae Espinosa, Ortea, Fernandez-Garcés & Moro, 2007
- Volvarina laureae Espinosa & Ortea, 2012
- Volvarina laurenti Espinosa & Ortea, 2012
- Volvarina leopoldoi Espinosa, Ortea & Magaña, 2018
- Volvarina lilianamariae Espinosa, Ortea & Diez, 2015
- Volvarina linae Espinosa & Ortea, 1999
- Volvarina lineae Espinosa & Ortea, 2012
- Volvarina lipparinii T. Cossignani & Lorenz, 2020
- Volvarina lipparinorum T. Cossignani & Lorenz, 2019
- Volvarina lopezae Ortea, 2014
- Volvarina lorenzoi Espinosa, Ortea & Pérez-Dionis, 2014
- Volvarina luzmarina Espinosa, Ortea & Pérez-Dionis, 2014
- Volvarina mabellae (Melvill & Standen, 1901)
- Volvarina macaoi Espinosa, Moro & Ortea, 2011
- † Volvarina macra Le Renard & van Nieulande, 1985
- Volvarina maestratii Espinosa & Ortea, 2012
- Volvarina magnini Espinosa & Ortea, 2012
- Volvarina maisiana Espinosa & Ortea, 2013
- Volvarina mangilyana Bozzetti, 2018
- Volvarina marcellii T. Cossignani & Lorenz, 2019
- Volvarina margitae T. Cossignani & Lorenz, 2019
- Volvarina mariaodeteae T. Cossignani, 2017
- Volvarina martinae T. Cossignani & Lorenz, 2021
- Volvarina martinezae Espinosa, Soto [Vázquez] & Ortea, 2022
- Volvarina martini Espinosa, Ortea & Moro, 2010
- Volvarina martinicaensis Espinosa & Ortea, 2013
- Volvarina matesi Espinosa, Ortea & Pérez-Dionis, 2014
- Volvarina mauricetteae Espinosa & Ortea, 2012
- Volvarina maya Espinosa & Ortea, 1998
- Volvarina maydeli Espinosa & Ortea, 2022
- Volvarina megapex Queiroz, Crabos, Pomponet & L. Passos, 2022
- Volvarina meguidae Ortea, 2014
- Volvarina mendoncae Ortea, 2014
- Volvarina mexicana Jousseaume, 1875
- Volvarina micans (Petit de la Saussaye, 1851)
- Volvarina micros Bavay, 1922
- Volvarina milanesi Espinosa, Ortea & Pina-Amargós, 2022
- Volvarina miniginella Espinosa, Ortea & Moro, 2010
- Volvarina mitrella (Risso, 1826)
- Volvarina mizrahiae Ortea, 2014
- Volvarina monchoi Caballer, Espinosa & Ortea, 2013
- Volvarina monicae Díaz, Espinosa & Ortea, 1996
- Volvarina monilis (Linnaeus, 1758)
- Volvarina montenegroae Ortea, 2014
- Volvarina mores Espinosa & Ortea, 2006
- Volvarina morrocoyensis Caballer, Espinosa & Ortea, 2013
- Volvarina nautica Espinosa & Ortea, 2015
- Volvarina nealei Wakefield & McCleery, 2004
- Volvarina nereidae Espinosa & Ortea, 2013
- Volvarina nibujona Espinosa & Ortea, 2013
- Volvarina nicasioi Espinosa, Ortea & Diez, 2015
- Volvarina nnekae Ortea, 2014
- Volvarina noeli Espinosa & Ortea, 1998
- Volvarina nuriae Moreno & Burnay, 1999
- Volvarina nympha Espinosa & Ortea, 1998
- Volvarina nyokongae Ortea, 2014
- Volvarina nyssa Roth & Coan, 1971
- † Volvarina oblongata (Sacco, 1890)
- Volvarina obscura (Reeve, 1865)
- Volvarina occidua (Cotton, 1944)
- Volvarina occulta Espinosa & Ortea, 2013
- Volvarina oceanica Gofas, 1989
- Volvarina ofeliae Cossignani, 1998
- Volvarina ondina Espinosa, Moro & Ortea, 2011
- Volvarina orozcoae Ortea, 2014
- Volvarina osmani Espinosa, Ortea & Moro, 2008
- Volvarina oteroi Espinosa, Ortea & Pérez-Dionis, 2014
- Volvarina pacificotica Espinosa, Ortea & Magaña, 2018
- Volvarina pallasae Espinosa & Ortea, 2015
- Volvarina pallidula (Dunker, 1871)
- Volvarina pandorae Espinosa & Ortea, 2015
- Volvarina parviginella Espinosa & Ortea, 2006
- Volvarina parvistriata Suter, 1908
- Volvarina parvitica Espinosa, Ortea & Magaña, 2018
- Volvarina patriciae Espinosa & Ortea, 2022
- Volvarina pauli de Jong & Coomans, 1988
- Volvarina paumotensis (Pease, 1868)
- Volvarina pedroelcojo Espinosa, Ortea & Diez, 2015
- Volvarina peimbertae Ortea, 2014
- Volvarina penelope Espinosa & Ortea, 2015
- Volvarina pepefragai Espinosa & Ortea, 1997
- Volvarina pergrandis Clover, 1974
- Volvarina pericalles (Tomlin, 1916)
- Volvarina perrieri (Bavay, 1906)
- Volvarina petitiana Boyer, 2018
- Volvarina petricola Espinosa, Moro & Ortea, 2011
- Volvarina philippinarum (Redfield, 1848)
- Volvarina phorcusi Espinosa & Ortea, 2015
- Volvarina pinero Espinosa, Soto [Vázquez] & Ortea, 2022
- Volvarina plicatula (Suter, 1910)
- Volvarina polini Fernández-Garcés, Espinosa & Ortea, 2019
- Volvarina pontesi Rios & Leal 1993
- Volvarina porcellana (Melvill & Standen, 1912)
- Volvarina pseudophilippinarum Cossignani, 2008
- Volvarina ptychasthena Gofas, 1989
- Volvarina pulchralineata Lussi & Smith, 1996
- Volvarina pupa (Bavay, 1922)
- Volvarina rancholunense Espinosa, Ortea & Diez, 2015
- Volvarina reeveana Boyer, 2018
- Volvarina remyi Espinosa & Ortea, 2012
- Volvarina renkerorum T. Cossignani & Lorenz, 2019
- Volvarina rex Laseron, 1957
- Volvarina rhiannae Ortea, 2021
- Volvarina riparia Gofas & Fernandes, 1992
- Volvarina roberti (Bavay, 1917)
- Volvarina rubella (C.B. Adams, 1845)
- Volvarina ryalli Boyer, 2006
- Volvarina sabinalensis Espinosa, Ortea & Moro, 2010
- Volvarina sanfelipensis Espinosa & Ortea, 2013
- Volvarina santacruzense Espinosa, Ortea & Diez, 2017
- Volvarina santiagocubense Espinosa, Ortea & Diez, 2015
- Volvarina santiaguera Espinosa, Ortea & Diez, 2013
- Volvarina saramagoi Espinosa, Ortea & Moro, 2013
- Volvarina sauliae (G.B. Sowerby II, 1846)
- Volvarina schmidlinorum T. Cossignani & Lorenz, 2019
- Volvarina sebastieni Espinosa & Ortea, 2012
- Volvarina serrei (Bavay, 1913)
- Volvarina shlegeli Bozzetti, 2017
- † Volvarina sibuzatiana Lozouet, 2019
- Volvarina snyderi Espinosa & Ortea, 2012
- Volvarina socoae Espinosa & Ortea, 1999
- Volvarina sofiae Ortea & Espinosa, 1998
- Volvarina somalica Boyer, 2015
- Volvarina somwangi Boyer, 2015
- Volvarina southwicki (Davis, 1904)
- Volvarina sowerbyana (Petit de la Saussaye, 1851)
- † Volvarina splendens (Grateloup, 1834)
- Volvarina splendida Cossignani, 2005
- Volvarina styria (Dall, 1889)
- Volvarina subtriplicata (d'Orbigny, 1842) – three-rib marginella
- Volvarina swenneni Espinosa, Ortea & Pérez-Dionis, 2014
- Volvarina sylviae T. Cossignani & Lorenz, 2021
- Volvarina taeniata (G.B. Sowerby II, 1846)
- Volvarina taeniolata Mörch, 1860 – California marginella
- Volvarina taina Espinosa & Ortea, 2013
- Volvarina tessae T. Cossignani, 2007
- Volvarina tetamariae Espinosa, Ortea & Moro, 2010
- Volvarina thaliae Espinosa & Ortea, 2015
- Volvarina thomsonae Ortea, 2014
- Volvarina tobyi Espinosa, Ortea & Diez, 2015
- Volvarina tollere Laseron, 1957
- Volvarina toroensis Espinosa & Ortea, 2015
- Volvarina torresina Laseron, 1957
- Volvarina tripartita Cossignani, 2006
- Volvarina triplicatilla Espinosa & Ortea, 2006
- † Volvarina tumulensis Lozouet, 1998
- Volvarina tunicata Boyer, 2000
- Volvarina umlaasensis Lussi & G. Smith, 1996
- Volvarina unilineata (Jousseaume, 1875)
- Volvarina utgei Espinosa & Ortea, 2012
- Volvarina varaderoensis Espinosa, Ortea & Moro, 2010
- Volvarina vassardi Espinosa & Ortea, 2012
- Volvarina veintimilliae Ortea, 2014
- Volvarina veraguasensis Wakefield & McCleery, 2005
- Volvarina verreauxi (Jousseaume, 1875)
- Volvarina vinosa Queiroz & Crabos, 2023
- Volvarina virginieae Espinosa & Ortea, 2012
- Volvarina vistamarina Espinosa & Ortea, 2002
- Volvarina vittata Espinosa, Moro & Ortea, 2011
- Volvarina vokesi de Jong & Coomans, 1988
- Volvarina wareni Espinosa & Ortea, 2012
- Volvarina warrenii (Marrat, 1876)
- Volvarina weissmannae Ortea, 2014
- Volvarina xamaneki Espinosa & Ortea, 2015
- Volvarina yaeli Espinosa, J. Martin & Ortea, 2009
- Volvarina yani Espinosa & Ortea, 2012
- Volvarina yayaeli Espinosa, Ortea & Moro, 2009
- Volvarina yolandae Espinosa & Ortea, 2000
- Volvarina yunkaxi Espinosa & Ortea, 2015
- Volvarina zatzae Ortea, 2014
- Volvarina zonata (Kiener, 1841)
  - Volvarina zonata f. bilineata Krauss, 1848

== Synonyms ==
- Volvarina abbotti De Jong & Coomans, 1988: synonym of Plesiocystiscus abbotti (De Jong & Coomans, 1988)
- Volvarina ambigua (Bavay in Dautzenberg, 1912): synonym of Volvarina ampelusica Monterosato, 1906
- Volvarina amphorale (de Souza, 1992): synonym of Prunum amphorale de Souza, 1992
- Volvarina amydrozona (Melvill, 1906): synonym of Balanetta amydrozona (Melvill, 1906)
- Volvarina avenacea auct.: synonym of Prunum bellulum (Dall, 1890)
- Volvarina bahiensis (Tomlin, 1917): synonym of Prunum bahiense (Tomlin, 1917)
- Volvarina biannulata auct.: synonym of Volvarina bilineata (Krauss, 1848)
- Volvarina bibalteata Reeve, 1865: synonym of Volvarina gracilis (C. B. Adams, 1851)
- Volvarina bilineata (Krauss, 1848): synonym of Volvarina zonata f. bilineata (F. Krauss, 1848)
- Volvarina blezai Ortea, 2019: sybinym of Mirpurina blezai (Ortea, 2019) (original combination)
- Volvarina bouvieri Jousseaume, 1877: synonym of Volvarina mediocincta (E. A. Smith, 1875)
- Volvarina californica Tomlin, 1916: synonym of Volvarina taeniolata Mörch, 1860
- Volvarina canilla (Dall, 1927): synonym of Prunum canilla (Dall, 1927)
- Volvarina capensis (Krauss, 1848): synonym of Prunum capense (Krauss, 1848)
- Volvarina cessaci Jousseaume, 1881: synonym of Volvarina taeniata (G. B. Sowerby II, 1846)
- Volvarina cleo (Bartsch, 1915): synonym of Volvarina bilineata (Krauss, 1848)
- Volvarina columnaria (Hedley & May 1908): synonym of Hydroginella columnaria (Hedley & May 1908)
- Volvarina curta Monterosato, 1884: synonym of Volvarina mitrella (Risso, 1826)
- Volvarina cylindrica (G. B. Sowerby II, 1846): synonym of Hyalina cylindrica (Sowerby II, 1846)
- Volvarina deformis G., H & Nevill, 1874: synonym of Demissa deformis (G. Nevill & H. Nevill, 1874) (superseded combination)
- Volvarina discors B. Roth, 1975: synonym of Hyalina discors (B. Roth, 1975) (superseded combination)
- Volvarina elongata Pease, 1868: synonym of Volvarina elliptica (Redfield, 1870)
- Volvarina emiliosoleri Ortea & Moro, 2019: synonym of Mirpurina emiliosoleri (Ortea & Moro, 2019) (original combination)
- Volvarina fulva Bavay, 1913: synonym of Volvarina serrei (Bavay, 1913)
- Volvarina fusca (Sowerby II, 1846): synonym of Volvarina exilis (Gmelin, 1791)
- Volvarina fusiformis Reeve, 1865: synonym of Volvarina unilineata (Jousseaume, 1875)
- Volvarina guttula Reeve, 1865: synonym of Volvarina southwicki (Davis, 1904)
- Volvarina hahni Mabille, 1884: synonym of Volvarina warrenii (Marrat, 1876)
- Volvarina hyalina (Thiele, 1912): synonym of Pustinella hyalina (Thiele, 1912)
- Volvarina illaqueo Ortea, Moro & Espinosa, 2019: synonym of Mirpurina illaqueo (Ortea, Moro & Espinosa, 2019) (original combination)
- Volvarina inconspicua G. Nevill & H. Nevill, 1874: synonym of Volvarina nevilli (Jousseaume, 1875)
- Volvarina inepta (Dall, 1927): synonym of Hyalina discors (Roth, 1974)
- Volvarina infans Reeve, 1865: synonym of Volvarina corusca (Reeve, 1865)
- Volvarina julia Thiele, 1925: synonym of Alaginella atracta (Tomlin, 1918)
- Volvarina kribiensis T. Cossignani & Prelle, 2010: synonym of Prunum mariateresae T. Cossignani, 2009
- Volvarina lactea (Kiener, 1841): synonym of Volvarina abbreviata (C. B. Adams, 1850)
- Volvarina livida Reeve, 1865: synonym of Volvarina avena (Kiener, 1834)
- Volvarina lucida (Marrat, 1877): synonym of Hyalina lucida (Marrat, 1877)
- † Volvarina malakosi Muñiz Solís, 2002: synonym of † Dentimargo malakosi (Muñiz Solís, 2002)
- Volvarina maoriana (Powell, 1932): synonym of Serrata maoriana (Powell, 1932)
- Volvarina mediocincta (E. A. Smith, 1875): synonym of Mirpurina mediocinta (E. A. Smith, 1875)
- Volvarina meta Thiele, 1925: synonym of Alaginella atracta (Tomlin, 1918)
- Volvarina mixta (Petterd, 1884): synonym of Hydroginella mixta (Petterd, 1884)
- Volvarina modulata (Laseron, 1957): synonym of Mesoginella modulata (Laseron, 1957)
- Volvarina morna Ortea, 2019: synonym of Mirpurina morna (Ortea, 2019) (original combination)
- Volvarina mustelina (Angas, 1871): synonym of Serrata mustelina (Angas, 1871)
- Volvarina nevilli (Jousseaume, 1875): synonym of Demissa nevilli (Jousseaume, 1875)
- Volvarina nunoi Moro, Espinosa & Ortea, 2019: synonym of Mirpurina nunoi (Moro, Espinosa & Ortea, 2019) (original combination)
- Volvarina nuriae Moreno & Burnay, 1999: synonym of Mirpurina nuriae (Moreno & Burnay, 1999) (superseded combination)
- Volvarina olivaeformis (Kiener, 1834): synonym of Prunum olivaeforme (Kiener, 1834)
- Volvarina pallida (Linnaeus, 1758): synonym of Hyalina pallida (Linnaeus, 1758)
- Volvarina parallela Dall, 1918: synonym of Volvarina taeniolata Mörch, 1860
- Volvarina parviginella Espinosa & Ortea, 2006: synonym of Marigordiella parviginella (Espinosa & Ortea, 2006)
- Volvarina parvula (Locard, 1897) : synonym of Volvarina attenuata (Reeve, 1865)
- Volvarina patagonica Martens, 1881: synonym of Volvarina warrenii (Marrat, 1876)
- Volvarina paula Thiele, 1925: synonym of Alaginella atracta (Tomlin, 1918)
- Volvarina paxillus (Reeve, 1865): synonym of Volvarina attenuata (Reeve, 1865)
- Volvarina pellucida Tenison-Woods, 1877: synonym of Serrata mustelina (Angas, 1871)
- Volvarina peregrina Gofas & Fernandes, 1992: synonym of Mirpurina peregrina (Gofas & F. Fernandes, 1992) (original combination)
- Volvarina puella Gould, 1861: synonym of Prunum capense (Krauss, 1848)
- Volvarina quadriplicata Risso, 1826: synonym of Volvarina mitrella (Risso, 1826)
- Volvarina quadripunctata (Locard, 1897): synonym of Volvarina taeniata (G. B. Sowerby II, 1846)
- Volvarina redfieldii (Tryon, 1883): synonym of Prunum redfieldii (Tryon, 1883)
- Volvarina rubrifasciata Jousseaume, 1875: synonym of Serrata fasciata (Sowerby II, 1846)
- Volvarina rufescens Reeve, 1865: synonym of Volvarina exilis (Gmelin, 1791)
- Volvarina serrata (Gaskoin, 1849): synonym of Serrata serrata (Gaskoin, 1849)
- Volvarina simeri Jousseaume, 1875: synonym of Volvarina exilis (Gmelin, 1791)
- Volvarina sordida (Reeve, 1865): synonym of Serrata delessertiana (Récluz, 1841)
- Volvarina stanislas Tenison-Woods, 1877: synonym of Serrata mustelina (Angas, 1871)
- Volvarina superstes (Laseron, 1957): synonym of Hydroginella superstes (Laseron, 1957)
- Volvarina tenuilabra (Tomlin, 1917): synonym of Hyalina pallida (Linnaeus, 1758)
- Volvarina torticulum (Dall, 1881): synonym of Prunum torticulum (Dall, 1881)
- Volvarina trailli (Reeve, 1865): synonym of Cryptospira trailli (Reeve, 1865)
- Volvarina tribalteata Reeve, 1865: synonym of Volvarina exilis (Gmelin, 1791)
- Volvarina tridentata (Tate, 1878): synonym of Hydroginella tridentata (Tate, 1878)
- † Volvarina vaquezi Cossmann, 1906: synonym of Volvarina cylindracea (Deshayes, 1865)
- Volvarina veliei (Pilsbry, 1896): synonym of Prunum succineum (Conrad, 1846)
- Volvarina verdensis (E.A.Smith, 1875): synonym of Mirpurina verdensis (E. A. Smith, 1875)
- Volvarina vermiculata Jousseaume, 1875: synonym of Volvarina avena (Kiener, 1834)
- Volvarina vincentiana (Cotton, 1944): synonym of Hydroginella vincentiana (Cotton, 1944)
- Volvarina volunta Laseron, 1957: synonym of Demissa volunta (Laseron, 1957)
