= Volvarina kidwelli =

Scientific classification
- Kingdom: Animalia
- Phylum: Mollusca
- Class: Gastropoda
- Subclass: Caenogastropoda
- Order: Neogastropoda
- Family: Marginellidae
- Genus: Volvarina
- Species: V. kidwelli

Binomial name
- Volvarina kidwelli Lussi & G. Smith, 1996

Species of gastropod

Volvarina kidwelli is a species of sea snail, a marine gastropod mollusk in the family Marginellidae, the margin snails.

== Distribution ==
This marine species occurs off Durban, South Africa.
