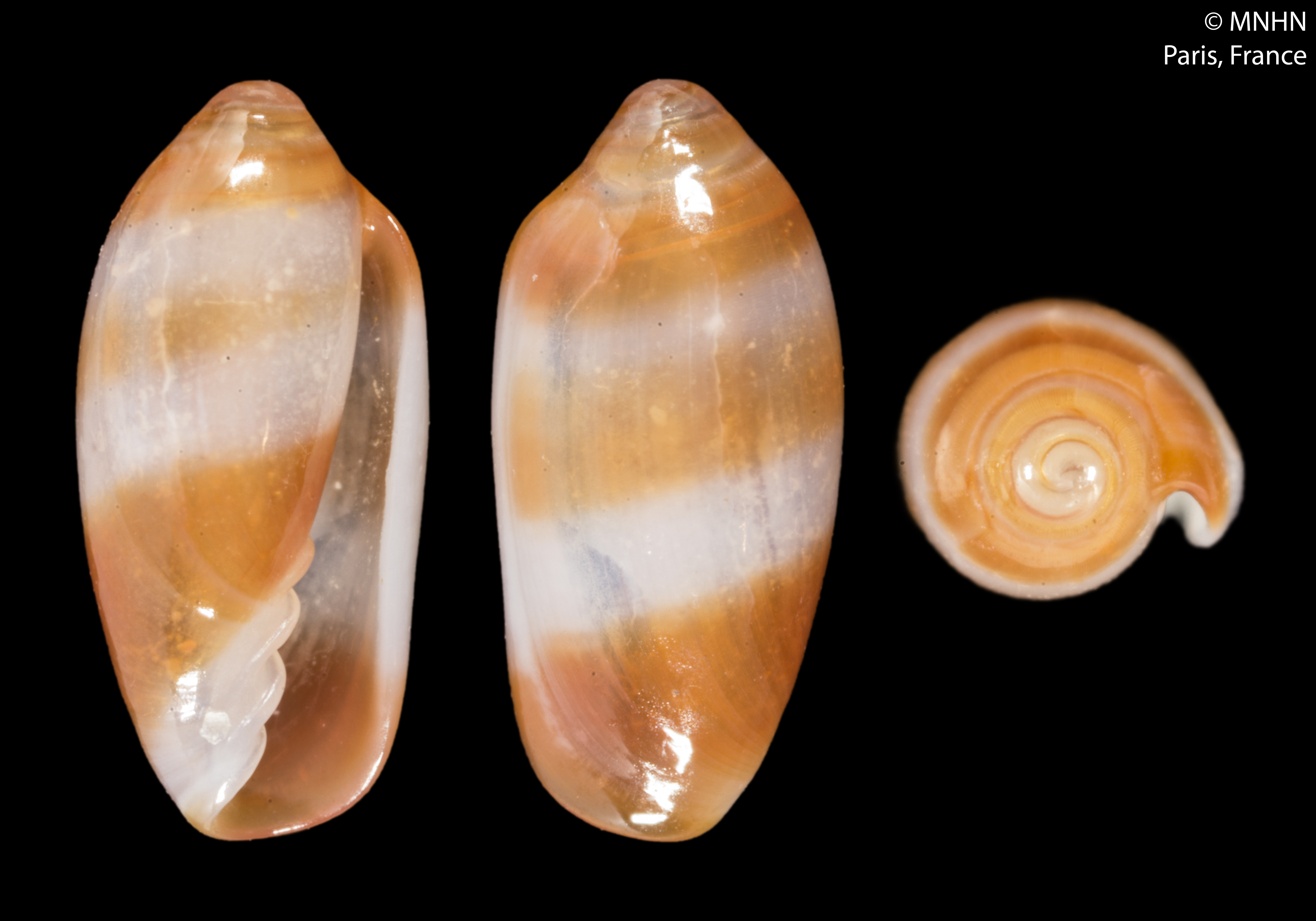
- Shell of Volvarina weissmannae (holotype in the MNHN, Paris)

Scientific classification
- Kingdom: Animalia
- Phylum: Mollusca
- Class: Gastropoda
- Subclass: Caenogastropoda
- Order: Neogastropoda
- Family: Marginellidae
- Subfamily: Marginellinae
- Genus: Volvarina
- Species: V. weissmannae

Binomial name
- Volvarina weissmannae Ortea, 2014

= Volvarina weissmannae =

Species of gastropod

Volvarina weissmannae is a species of sea snail, a marine gastropod mollusk in the family Marginellidae, the margin snails.

== Distribution ==
This marine species occurs off Guadeloupe in the Caribbean Sea.
