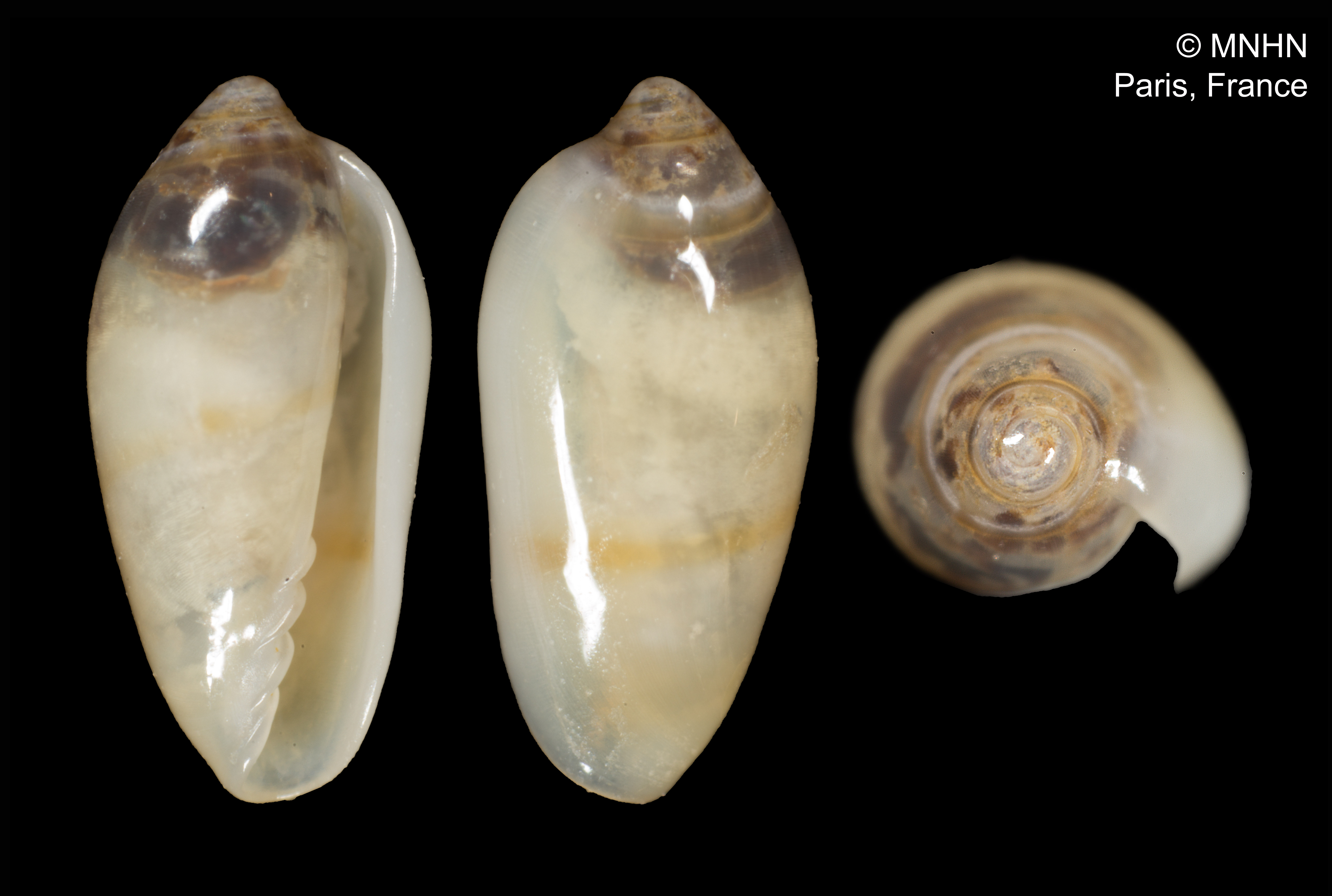
- Shell of Volvarina florenceae (holotype at MNHN, Paris)

Scientific classification
- Kingdom: Animalia
- Phylum: Mollusca
- Class: Gastropoda
- Subclass: Caenogastropoda
- Order: Neogastropoda
- Family: Marginellidae
- Subfamily: Marginellinae
- Genus: Volvarina
- Species: V. florenceae

Binomial name
- Volvarina florenceae Espinosa & Ortea, 2012

Synonyms
- Volvarina (Creolina) florenceae Espinosa & Ortea, 2012 · alternate representation

= Volvarina florenceae =

Species of gastropod

Volvarina florenceae is a species of sea snail, a marine gastropod mollusk in the family Marginellidae, the margin snails.

== Description ==
The length of the shell attains 4.1 mm, its diameter is 2.02 mm.

== Distribution ==
This marine species occurs off Guadeloupe in the Caribbean Sea.
