= Volvarina ginae =

Scientific classification
- Kingdom: Animalia
- Phylum: Mollusca
- Class: Gastropoda
- Subclass: Caenogastropoda
- Order: Neogastropoda
- Family: Marginellidae
- Genus: Volvarina
- Species: V. ginae

Binomial name
- Volvarina ginae Espinosa & Ortea, 2003

Species of gastropod

Volvarina ginae is a species of sea snail, a marine gastropod mollusk in the family Marginellidae, the margin snails.
