= Volvarina ofeliae =

Scientific classification
- Kingdom: Animalia
- Phylum: Mollusca
- Class: Gastropoda
- Subclass: Caenogastropoda
- Order: Neogastropoda
- Family: Marginellidae
- Genus: Volvarina
- Species: V. ofeliae

Binomial name
- Volvarina ofeliae Cossignani, 1998

Species of gastropod

Volvarina ofeliae is a species of sea snail, a marine gastropod mollusk in the family Marginellidae, the margin snails.

== Distribution ==
This marine species occurs off South Africa, off Mossel Bay
