= Volvarina criolla =

Scientific classification
- Kingdom: Animalia
- Phylum: Mollusca
- Class: Gastropoda
- Subclass: Caenogastropoda
- Order: Neogastropoda
- Family: Marginellidae
- Genus: Volvarina
- Species: V. criolla

Binomial name
- Volvarina criolla Espinosa & Ortea, 2003

Species of gastropod

Volvarina criolla is a species of sea snail, a marine gastropod mollusk in the family Marginellidae, the margin snails.
