= Volvarina martinezae =

Scientific classification
- Kingdom: Animalia
- Phylum: Mollusca
- Class: Gastropoda
- Subclass: Caenogastropoda
- Order: Neogastropoda
- Family: Marginellidae
- Subfamily: Marginellinae
- Genus: Volvarina
- Species: V. martinezae

Binomial name
- Volvarina martinezae Espinosa, Soto [Vázquez] & Ortea, 2022

Species of gastropod

Volvarina martinezae is a species of sea snail, a marine gastropod mollusk in the family Marginellidae, the margin snails.

== Description ==
The length of the shell attains 9.4 mm, its diameter is 4.2 mm. It has a cylindrical shape, and the spire is low or sometimes slightly elevated.

Their functional type is benthos.

Their feeding type is predatory.

== Distribution ==
This marine species occurs off Cuba in the Caribbean Sea.

== Etymology ==
The specific name, martinezae, is in honour of the Cuban marine zoologist Nereida Martinez Estalella.
