= Volvarina adrianadiae =

Scientific classification
- Kingdom: Animalia
- Phylum: Mollusca
- Class: Gastropoda
- Subclass: Caenogastropoda
- Order: Neogastropoda
- Family: Marginellidae
- Genus: Volvarina
- Species: V. adrianadiae

Binomial name
- Volvarina adrianadiae Cossignani, 2006

Species of gastropod

Volvarina adrianadiae is a species of sea snail, a marine gastropod mollusk in the family Marginellidae, Neogastropoda, the margin snails.

== Description ==
The length of the shell attains 6.5 mm. Is believed to be carnivorous and most likely predatory but no known reports.

== Distribution ==
This marine species occurs off Colombia in the Western Atlantic. Discovered by Marginellinae J. Fleming, 1828. Lives in 73.4 °F - 78.8 °F (23°C - 26°C).

== Taxonomy ==
- Animalia (Kingdom)
- Mollusca (Phylum)
- Gastropoda (Class)
- Caenogastropoda (Subclass)
- Neogastropoda (Order)
- Volutoidea (Superfamily)
- Marginellidae (Family)
- Marginellinae (Subfamily)
- Volvarina (Genus)
