= Volvarina artemisae =

Scientific classification
- Kingdom: Animalia
- Phylum: Mollusca
- Class: Gastropoda
- Subclass: Caenogastropoda
- Order: Neogastropoda
- Family: Marginellidae
- Genus: Volvarina
- Species: V. artemisae

Binomial name
- Volvarina artemisae Espinosa & Ortea, 2013

Species of gastropod

Volvarina artemisae is a species of sea snail, a marine gastropod mollusk in the family Marginellidae, the margin snails.

== Description ==
The length of the shell attains 5.3 mm, its diameter 2.4mm. The shell itself is smooth and shiny. It is long and subcylindrical, with a slightly convex left side. The shape includes about 3 turns, with the last turn taking up around 80% of the shells length. The opening to the shell is long and narrow, with a wide, thick lip. The shell's colouring is a dark orange-brown, with three white bands.

== Distribution ==
This marine species occurs off Cuba in the Caribbean Sea.
