= Volvarina carmelae =

Scientific classification
- Kingdom: Animalia
- Phylum: Mollusca
- Class: Gastropoda
- Subclass: Caenogastropoda
- Order: Neogastropoda
- Family: Marginellidae
- Genus: Volvarina
- Species: V. carmelae

Binomial name
- Volvarina carmelae Espinosa & Ortea, 1998

Species of gastropod

Volvarina carmelae is a species of sea snail, a marine gastropod mollusk in the family Marginellidae, the margin snails. It is endemic to the Gulf of Mexico.

== Distribution ==
Volvarina carmelae is endemic to the Gulf of Mexico, around north-western Cuba.
