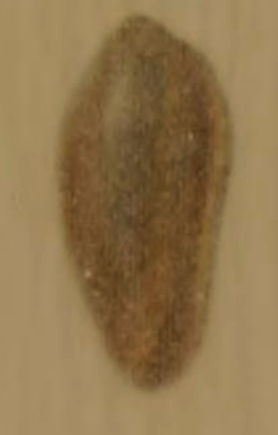
- Shell of Volvarina joubini (holotype)

Scientific classification
- Kingdom: Animalia
- Phylum: Mollusca
- Class: Gastropoda
- Subclass: Caenogastropoda
- Order: Neogastropoda
- Family: Marginellidae
- Subfamily: Marginellinae
- Genus: Volvarina
- Species: V. joubini

Binomial name
- Volvarina joubini (Daudzenberg & Fisher, 1906)

Synonyms
- Marginella (Volvarina) joubini Dautzenberg & H. Fischer, 1906 (original combination)

= Volvarina joubini =

Species of gastropod

Volvarina joubini is a species of sea snail, a marine gastropod mollusk in the family Marginellidae, the margin snails.

== Description ==
The length of the shell attains 8 mm, its diameter 3.5 mm.

(Original description in Latin) The shell is rather solid, elongate-subcylindrical and very shiny. The spire is short and contains 3.5 convex and smooth whorls, separated by a hardly visible suture. The body whorl measures occupies about the whole length of the shell. The aperture is narrow, constricted in the middle, scarcely dilated at the base. There are four columellar plaits. The outer lip is thickened and bent in the middle.

The shell has a tawny color with two decurrent bands barely lighter than the background. The upper one is wider and is located at a short distance from the suture. The lower band is narrower and is situated a little below the middle of the nody. These two bands transform, on the thickened external part of the outer lip, into two very clear white spots.

== Distribution ==
This marine species occurs off the Cape Verdes
