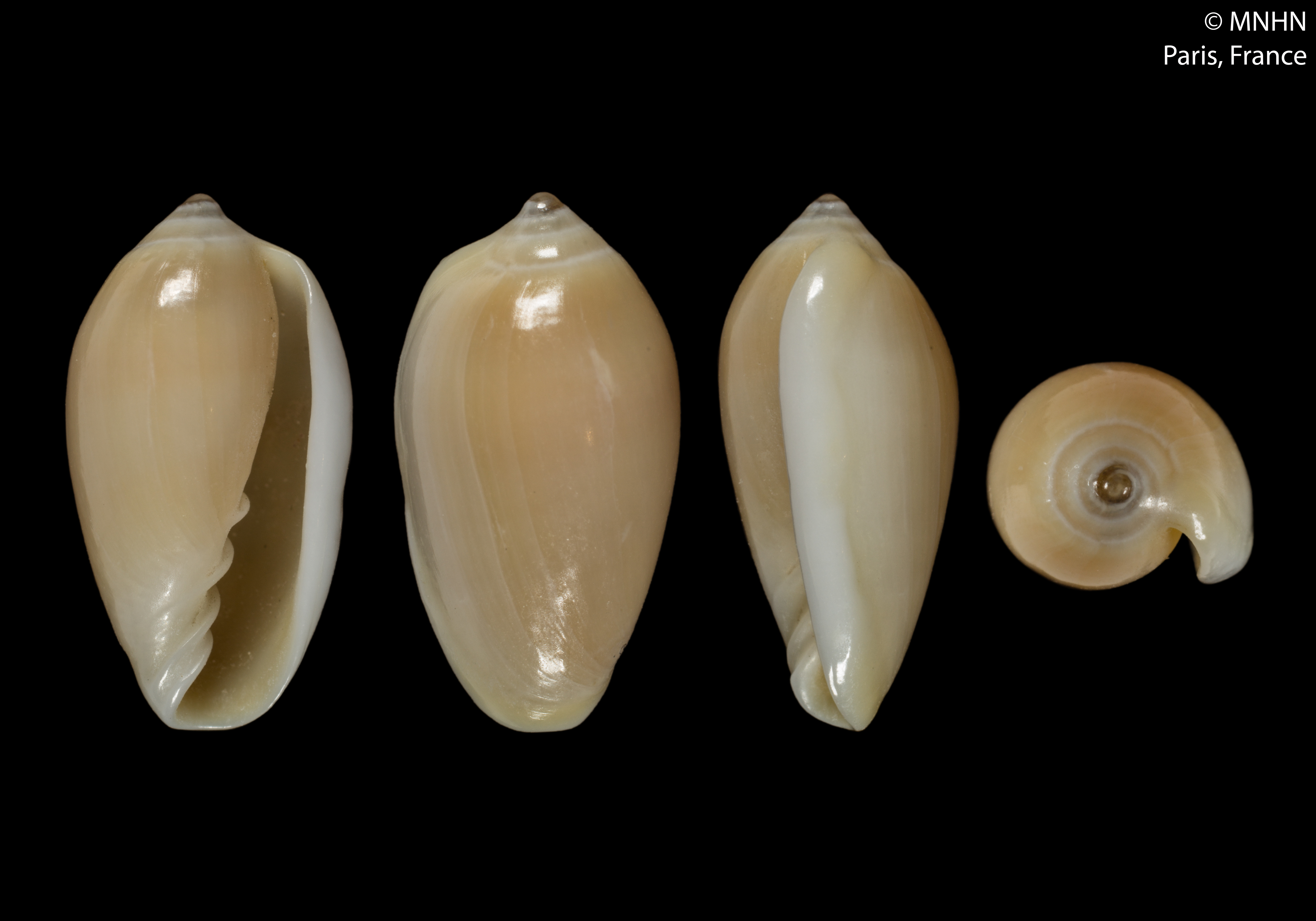
- Shell of Volvarina mangilyana (holotype at MNHN, Paris)

Scientific classification
- Kingdom: Animalia
- Phylum: Mollusca
- Class: Gastropoda
- Subclass: Caenogastropoda
- Order: Neogastropoda
- Family: Marginellidae
- Genus: Volvarina
- Species: V. mangilyana

Binomial name
- Volvarina mangilyana Bozzetti, 2018

= Volvarina mangilyana =

Species of gastropod

Volvarina mangilyana is a species of sea snail, a marine gastropod mollusk in the family Marginellidae, the margin snails.

== Description ==
The length of the shell attains 11.26 mm.

== Distribution ==
This marine species occurs off Madagascar.
