= Volvarina yolandae =

Scientific classification
- Kingdom: Animalia
- Phylum: Mollusca
- Class: Gastropoda
- Subclass: Caenogastropoda
- Order: Neogastropoda
- Family: Marginellidae
- Genus: Volvarina
- Species: V. yolandae

Binomial name
- Volvarina yolandae Espinosa & Ortea, 2000

Species of gastropod

Volvarina yolandae is a species of sea snail, a marine gastropod mollusk in the family Marginellidae, the margin snails.

== Description ==
The length of the shell attains 6 mm.

== Distribution ==
This marine species occurs in the Caribbean Sea off Costa Rica.
