= Volvarina bevdeynzerae =

Scientific classification
- Kingdom: Animalia
- Phylum: Mollusca
- Class: Gastropoda
- Subclass: Caenogastropoda
- Order: Neogastropoda
- Family: Marginellidae
- Genus: Volvarina
- Species: V. bevdeynzerae

Binomial name
- Volvarina bevdeynzerae Cossignani, 2005

Species of gastropod

Volvarina bevdeynzerae is a species of sea snail, a marine gastropod mollusk in the family Marginellidae, the margin snails.

== Description ==
The length of the shell attains 5.5 mm.

== Distribution ==
This marine species occurs off the Philippines.
