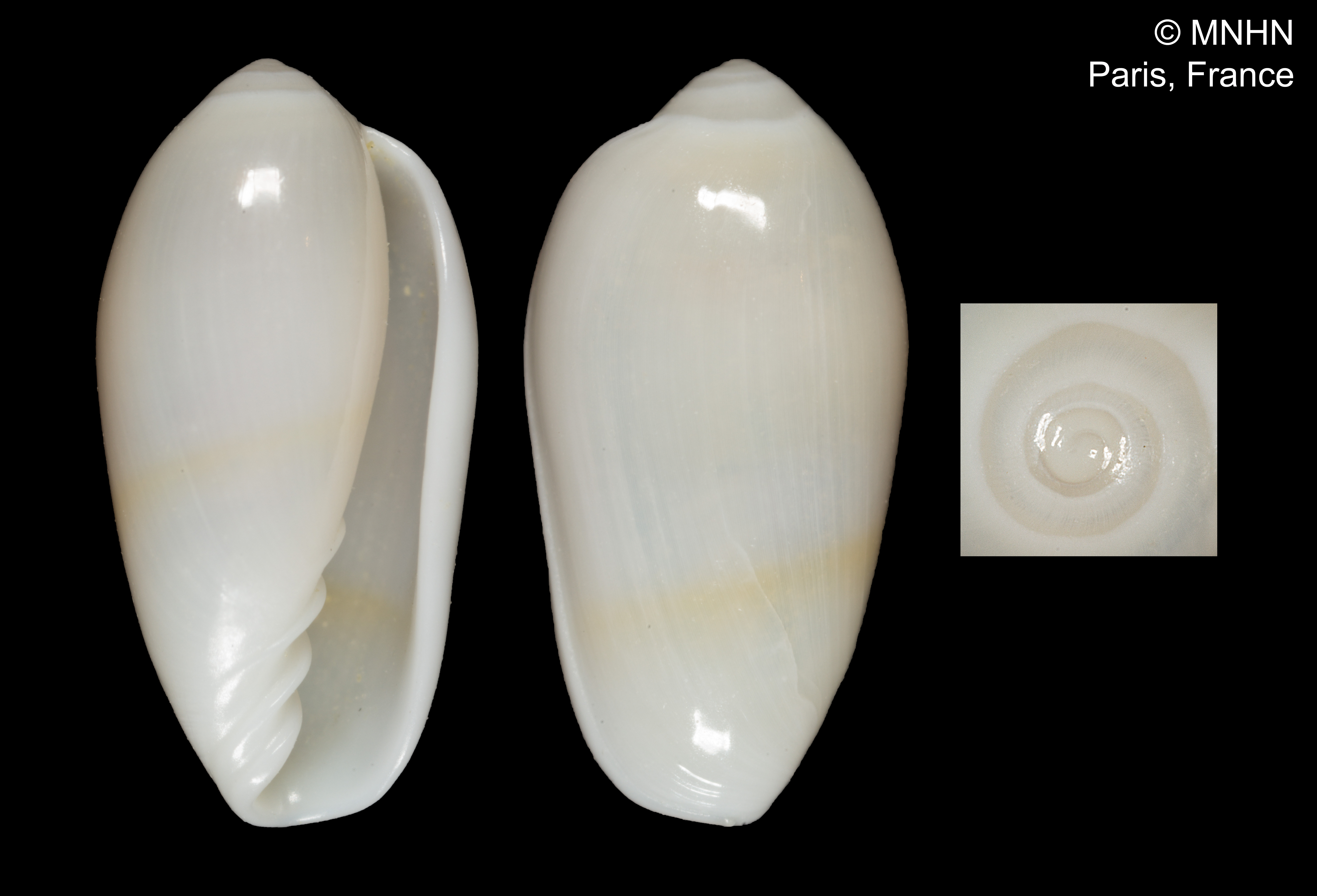
- Shell of Volvarina fugax (holotype at MNHN, Paris)

Scientific classification
- Kingdom: Animalia
- Phylum: Mollusca
- Class: Gastropoda
- Subclass: Caenogastropoda
- Order: Neogastropoda
- Family: Marginellidae
- Genus: Volvarina
- Species: V. fugax

Binomial name
- Volvarina fugax Gofas & F. Fernandes, 1992

= Volvarina fugax =

Species of gastropod

Volvarina fugax is a species of sea snail, a marine gastropod mollusk in the family Marginellidae, the margin snails.

== Description ==
The length of the shell attains 6.3 mm.

== Distribution ==
This marine species occurs off Angola, Southern Atlantic Ocean.
