= Volvarina avesensis =

Scientific classification
- Kingdom: Animalia
- Phylum: Mollusca
- Class: Gastropoda
- Subclass: Caenogastropoda
- Order: Neogastropoda
- Family: Marginellidae
- Genus: Volvarina
- Species: V. avesensis

Binomial name
- Volvarina avesensis Caballer, Espinosa & Ortea, 2013

Species of gastropod

Volvarina avesensis is a species of sea snail, a marine gastropod mollusk in the family Marginellidae, the margin snails.

== Description ==
The length of this marine species attains 6.9 mm, its diameter 3.15 mm.

== Distribution ==
Volvarina avesensis can be found in Caribbean waters off Venezuela.
