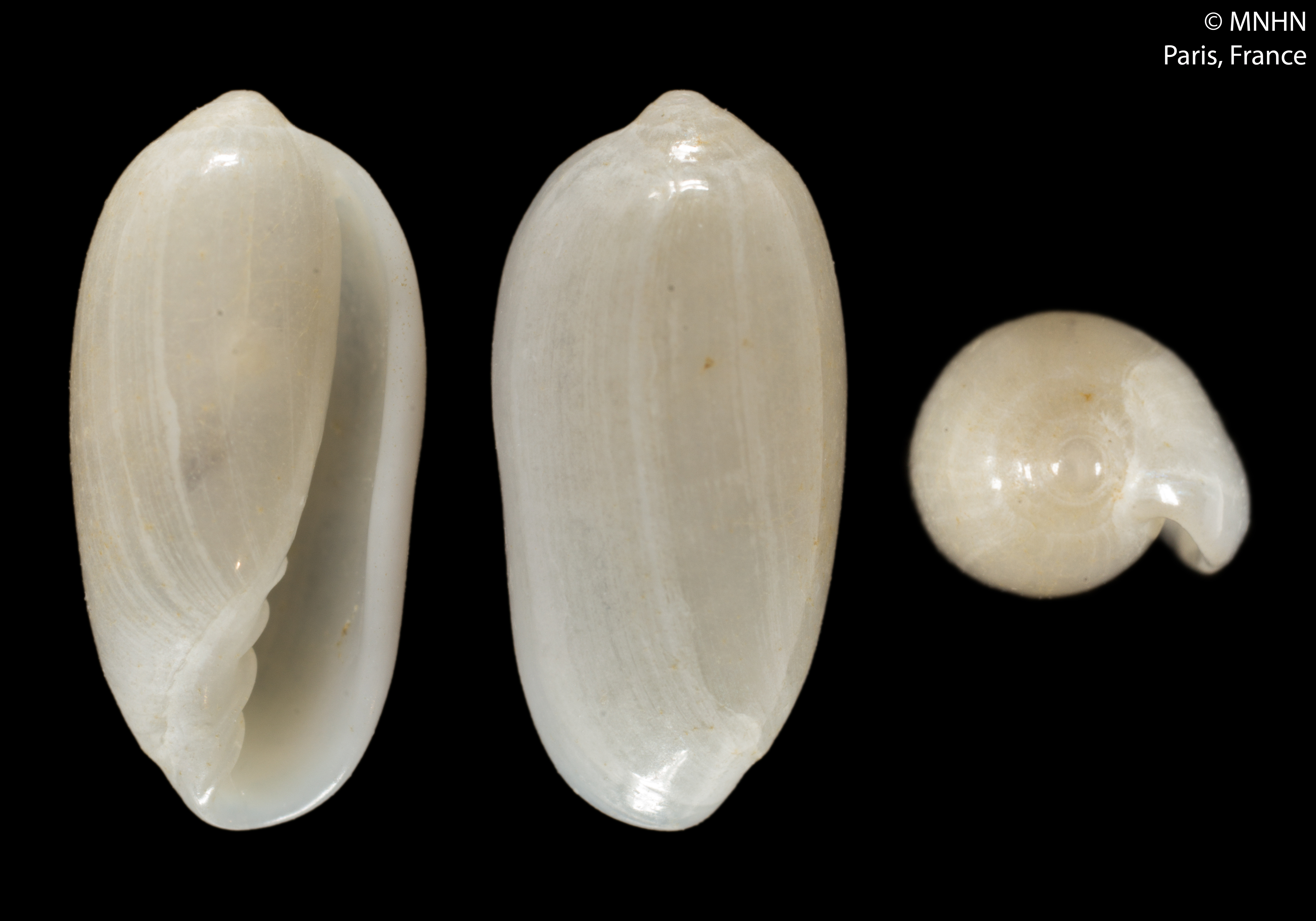
- Shell of Volvarina guribae (holotype in the MNHN, Paris)

Scientific classification
- Kingdom: Animalia
- Phylum: Mollusca
- Class: Gastropoda
- Subclass: Caenogastropoda
- Order: Neogastropoda
- Family: Marginellidae
- Subfamily: Marginellinae
- Genus: Volvarina
- Species: V. guribae

Binomial name
- Volvarina guribae Ortea, 2014

= Volvarina guribae =

Species of gastropod

Volvarina guribae is a species of sea snail, a marine gastropod mollusk in the family Marginellidae, the margin snails.

== Description ==
The length of the shell attains 7.13 mm, its diameter is 3.34 mm.

== Distribution ==
This marine species occurs off Guadeloupe in the Caribbean Sea.
