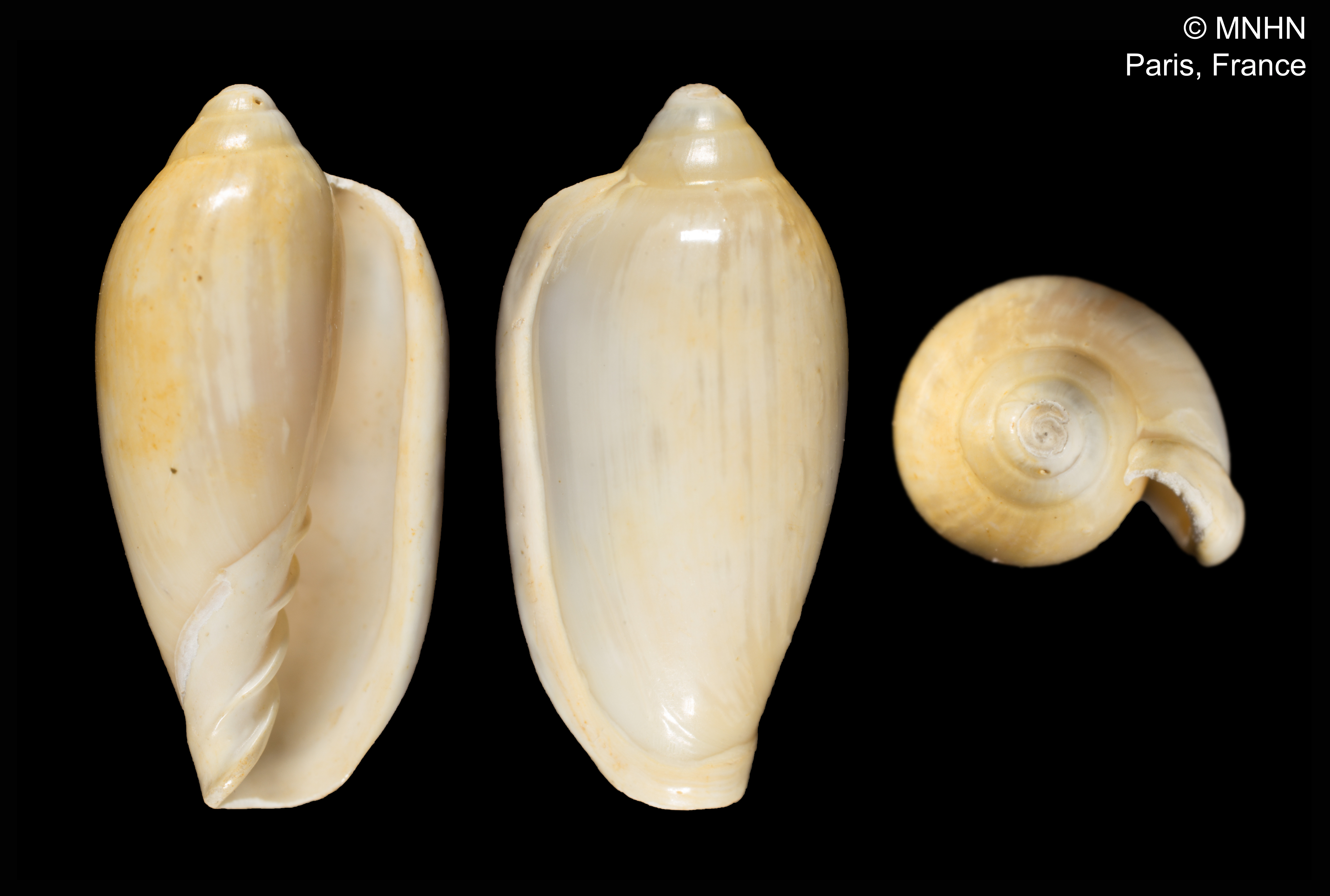
- Shell of Volvarina ryalli (holotype at MNHN, Paris)

Scientific classification
- Kingdom: Animalia
- Phylum: Mollusca
- Class: Gastropoda
- Subclass: Caenogastropoda
- Order: Neogastropoda
- Family: Marginellidae
- Genus: Volvarina
- Species: V. ryalli

Binomial name
- Volvarina ryalli Boyer, 2006

= Volvarina ryalli =

Species of gastropod

Volvarina ryalli is a species of sea snail, a marine gastropod mollusk in the family Marginellidae, the margin snails.

== Description ==
The length of the shell attains 13.85 mm.

== Distribution ==
This marine species occurs off the Ivory Coast, Gulf of Guinea.
