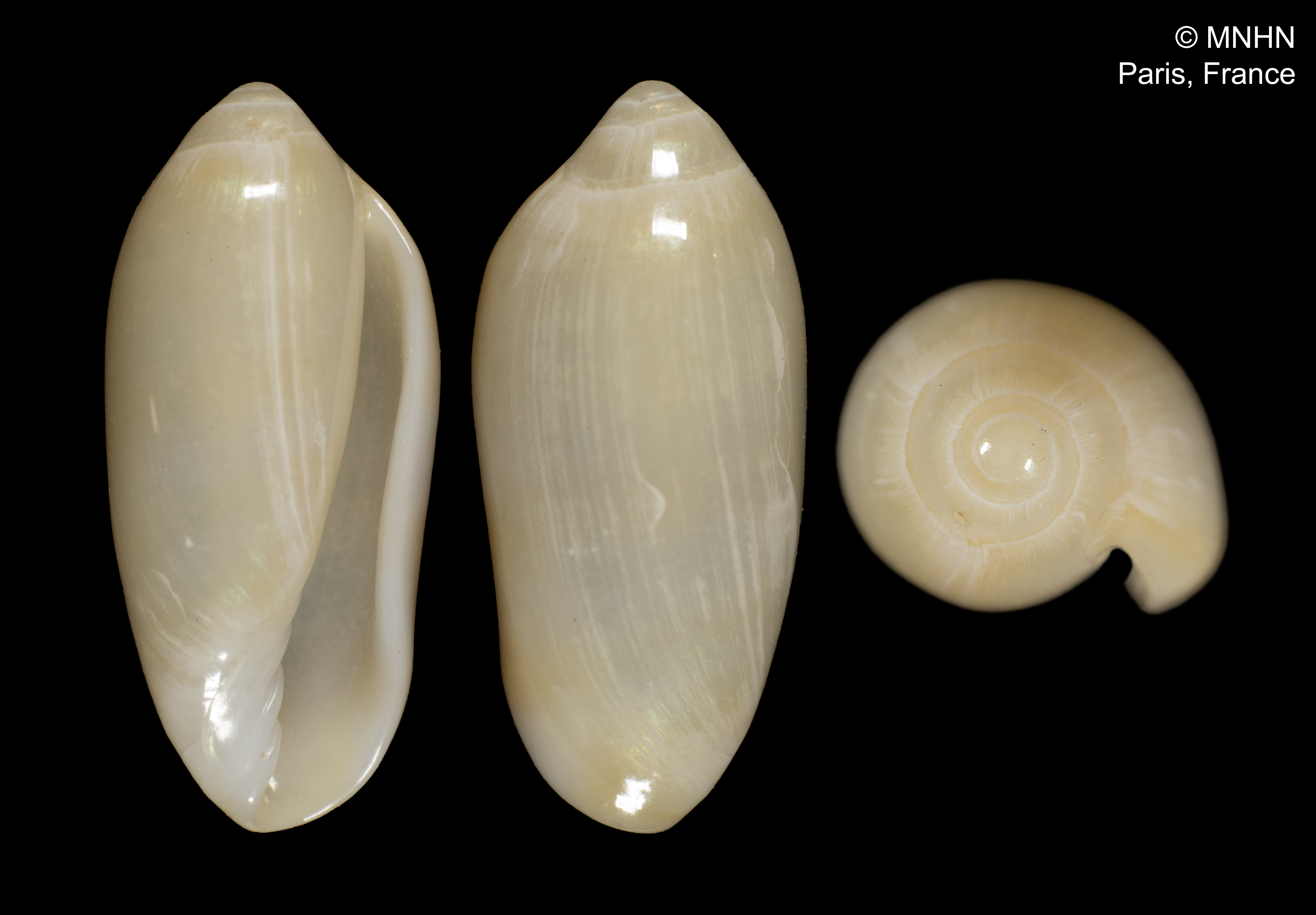
- Shell of Volvarina ptychasthena (holotype at MNHN, Paris)

Scientific classification
- Kingdom: Animalia
- Phylum: Mollusca
- Class: Gastropoda
- Subclass: Caenogastropoda
- Order: Neogastropoda
- Family: Marginellidae
- Genus: Volvarina
- Species: V. ptychasthena

Binomial name
- Volvarina ptychasthena Gofas, 1989

= Volvarina ptychasthena =

Species of gastropod

Volvarina ptychasthena is a species of sea snail, a marine gastropod mollusk in the family Marginellidae, the margin snails.

== Description ==
The length of the shell attains 10.6 mm.

== Distribution ==
This species occurs in the Atlantic Ocean off the Azores.
