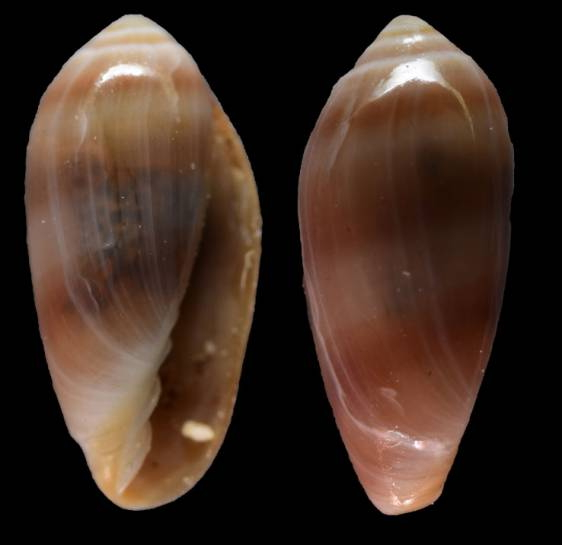
- Shell of Volvarina yayaeli

Scientific classification
- Kingdom: Animalia
- Phylum: Mollusca
- Class: Gastropoda
- Subclass: Caenogastropoda
- Order: Neogastropoda
- Family: Marginellidae
- Genus: Volvarina
- Species: V. yayaeli

Binomial name
- Volvarina yayaeli Espinosa, Ortea & Moro, 2009

= Volvarina yayaeli =

Species of gastropod

Volvarina yayaeli is a species of sea snail, a marine gastropod mollusk in the family Marginellidae, the margin snails.

== Distribution ==
This marine species occurs off Cuba.
