= Volvarina fasciata =

Scientific classification
- Kingdom: Animalia
- Phylum: Mollusca
- Class: Gastropoda
- Subclass: Caenogastropoda
- Order: Neogastropoda
- Family: Marginellidae
- Genus: Volvarina
- Species: V. fasciata

Binomial name
- Volvarina fasciata Lussi & G. Smith, 1996

Species of gastropod

Volvarina fasciata is a species of sea snail, a marine gastropod mollusk in the family Marginellidae, the margin snails.

== Description ==
The length of the shell attains 4.2 mm.

== Distribution ==
This marine species occurs off Natal, South Africa.
