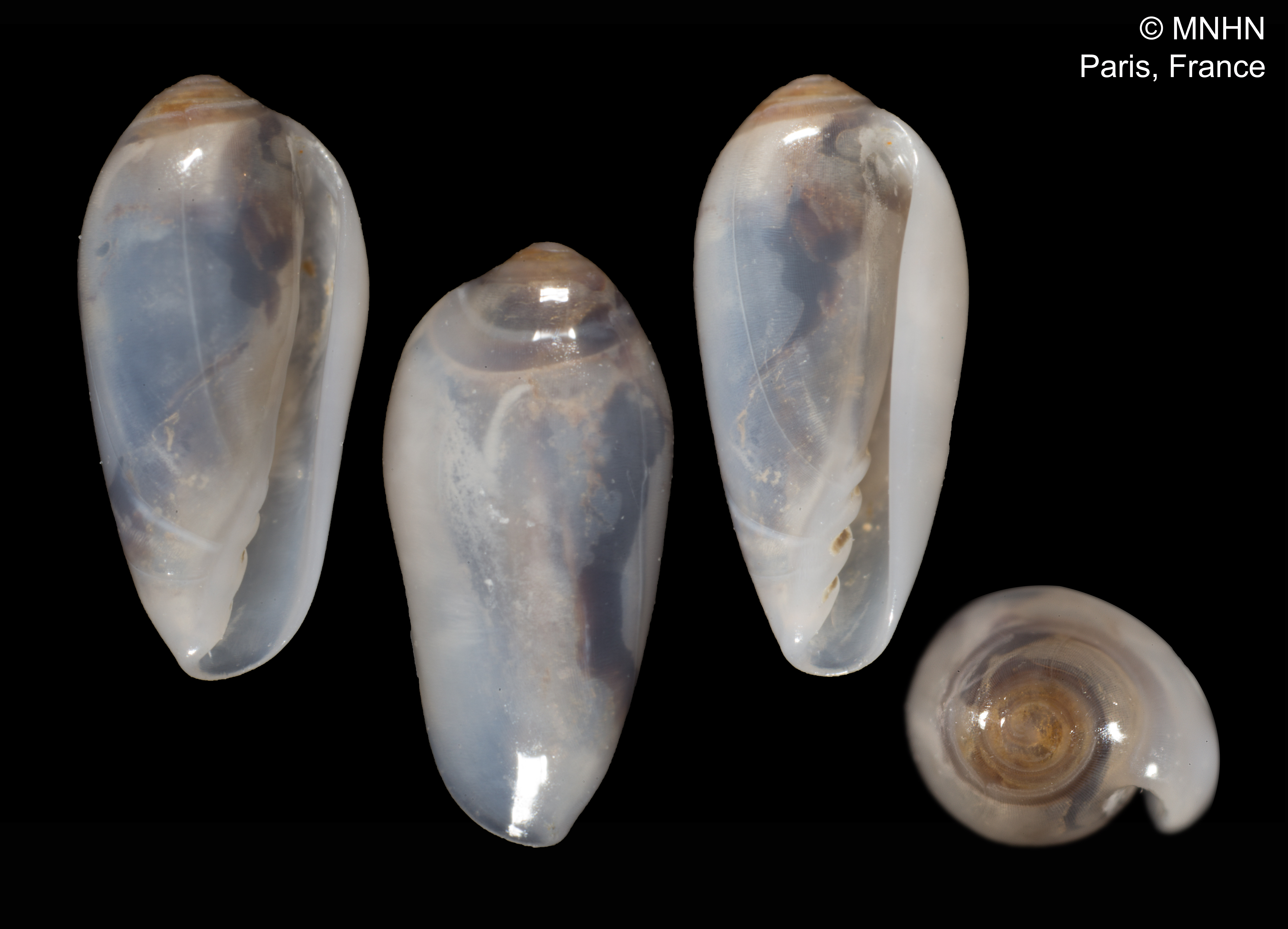
- Shell of Volvarina laureae (holotype at MNHN, Paris)

Scientific classification
- Kingdom: Animalia
- Phylum: Mollusca
- Class: Gastropoda
- Subclass: Caenogastropoda
- Order: Neogastropoda
- Family: Marginellidae
- Genus: Volvarina
- Species: V. laureae

Binomial name
- Volvarina laureae Espinosa & Ortea, 2012

= Volvarina laureae =

Species of gastropod

Volvarina laureae is a species of sea snail, a marine gastropod mollusk in the family Marginellidae, the margin snails.

== Description ==
The length of the shell attains 4.5mm, its diameter 2.1mm. Its shell also consists of blue and orange tints on it.

== Distribution ==
This marine species occurs off Guadeloupe.
