= Volvarina maisiana =

Scientific classification
- Kingdom: Animalia
- Phylum: Mollusca
- Class: Gastropoda
- Subclass: Caenogastropoda
- Order: Neogastropoda
- Family: Marginellidae
- Genus: Volvarina
- Species: V. maisiana

Binomial name
- Volvarina maisiana Espinosa & Ortea, 2013

Species of gastropod

Volvarina maisiana is a species of sea snail, a marine gastropod mollusk in the family Marginellidae, the margin snails.

== Description ==
The length of the shell attains 7.7 mm, its diameter 3 mm.

== Distribution ==
This marine species occurs off Cuba in the Caribbean Sea.
