= Volvarina gianmariacannarai =

Scientific classification
- Kingdom: Animalia
- Phylum: Mollusca
- Class: Gastropoda
- Subclass: Caenogastropoda
- Order: Neogastropoda
- Family: Marginellidae
- Subfamily: Marginellinae
- Genus: Volvarina
- Species: V. gianmariacannarai

Binomial name
- Volvarina gianmariacannarai T. Cossignani & Lorenz, 2019

Species of gastropod

Volvarina gianmariacannarai is a species of sea snail, a marine gastropod mollusk in the family Marginellidae, the margin snails.

== Description ==
The length of the shell attains 11.5 mm.

== Distribution ==
This marine species occurs off Turks and Caicos, Northern West Indies.
