= Volvarina bacona =

Scientific classification
- Kingdom: Animalia
- Phylum: Mollusca
- Class: Gastropoda
- Subclass: Caenogastropoda
- Order: Neogastropoda
- Family: Marginellidae
- Genus: Volvarina
- Species: V. bacona

Binomial name
- Volvarina bacona Espinosa, Ortea & Diez, 2012

Species of gastropod

Volvarina bacona is a species of sea snail, a marine gastropod mollusk in the family Marginellidae, the margin snails.

== Description ==
The length of the shell attains 7.2 mm, its diameter 3.25 mm.

== Distribution ==
This marine species occurs off Cuba, Caribbean Sea.
