= Volvarina veraguasensis =

Scientific classification
- Kingdom: Animalia
- Phylum: Mollusca
- Class: Gastropoda
- Subclass: Caenogastropoda
- Order: Neogastropoda
- Family: Marginellidae
- Genus: Volvarina
- Species: V. veraguasensis

Binomial name
- Volvarina veraguasensis Wakefield & McCleery, 2005

Species of gastropod

Volvarina veraguasensis is a species of sea snail, a marine gastropod mollusk in the family Marginellidae, the margin snails.

== Distribution ==
This marine species occurs off Northern Panama.
