= Volvarina nibujona =

Scientific classification
- Kingdom: Animalia
- Phylum: Mollusca
- Class: Gastropoda
- Subclass: Caenogastropoda
- Order: Neogastropoda
- Family: Marginellidae
- Genus: Volvarina
- Species: V. nibujona

Binomial name
- Volvarina nibujona Espinosa & Ortea, 2013

Species of gastropod

Volvarina nibujona is a species of sea snail, a marine gastropod mollusk in the family Marginellidae, the margin snails.

== Description ==
The length of the shell attains 8.15 mm, its diameter 3.4 mm.

== Distribution ==
This marine species occurs off Cuba in the Caribbean Sea.
