= Volvarina tripartita =

Scientific classification
- Kingdom: Animalia
- Phylum: Mollusca
- Class: Gastropoda
- Subclass: Caenogastropoda
- Order: Neogastropoda
- Family: Marginellidae
- Genus: Volvarina
- Species: V. tripartita

Binomial name
- Volvarina tripartita Cossignani, 2006

Species of gastropod

Volvarina tripartita is a species of sea snail, a marine gastropod mollusk in the family Marginellidae, the margin snails.

== Description ==
The length of the shell attains 13.4 mm.

== Distribution ==
This marine species occurs off Brazil.
