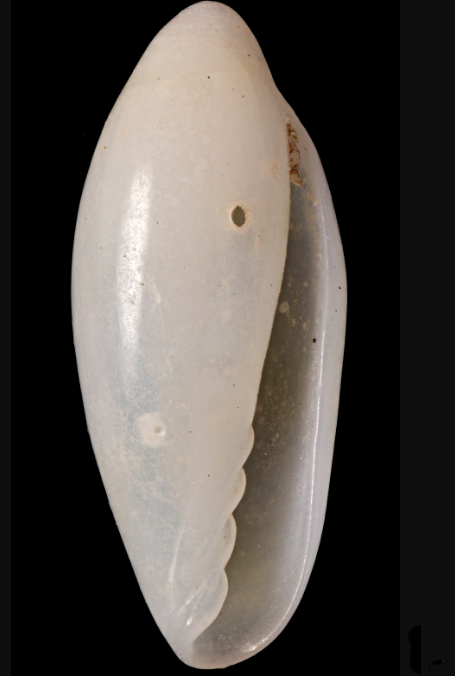
- Shell of Volvarina martinae (holotype at MNHN, Paris)

Scientific classification
- Kingdom: Animalia
- Phylum: Mollusca
- Class: Gastropoda
- Subclass: Caenogastropoda
- Order: Neogastropoda
- Family: Marginellidae
- Genus: Volvarina
- Species: V. martinae

Binomial name
- Volvarina martinae T. Cossignani & Lorenz, 2021

= Volvarina martinae =

Species of gastropod

Volvarina martinae is a species of sea snail, a marine gastropod mollusk in the family Marginellidae, the margin snails.

== Description ==
The length of the shell attains 6.4 mm.

== Distribution ==
This marine species occurs off Papua New Guinea.
