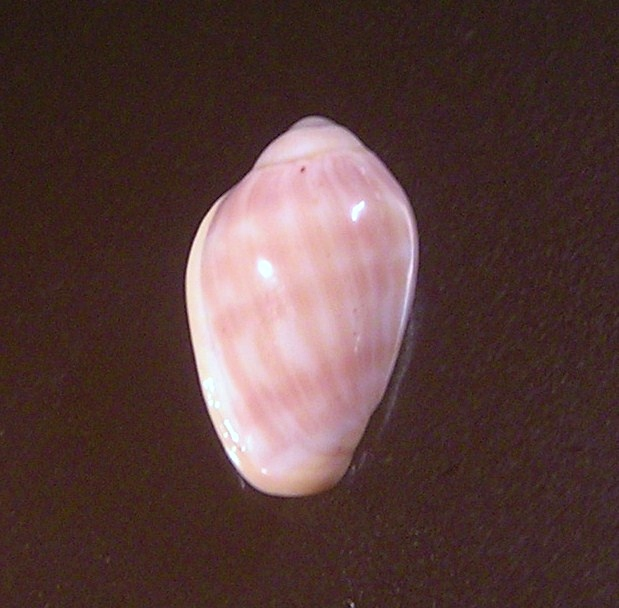
- Prunum fulminatum

Scientific classification
- Kingdom: Animalia
- Phylum: Mollusca
- Class: Gastropoda
- Subclass: Caenogastropoda
- Order: Neogastropoda
- Superfamily: Volutoidea
- Family: Marginellidae
- Subfamily: Pruninae
- Genus: Prunum; Herrmannsen, 1852

Type species
- Voluta prunum Gmelin, 1791

Synonyms
- Egouena Jousseaume, 1875; Leptegouana Woodring, 1928; Marginella (Prunum) H. Adams & A. Adams, 1853; † Microspira Conrad, 1868; † Porcellanella Tryon, 1882 (invalid: junior homonym of Porcellanella White, 1852 [Crustacea].)

= Prunum =

Genus of gastropods

Prunum is a genus of sea snails, marine gastropod molluscs in the subfamily Pruninae of the family Marginellidae, the margin snails.

The separation between the genera Prunum and Volvarina is not very precise. They form together a monophyletic clade. The differences between these two genera are based on differences in the morphology of the shell, the radula, the radular cartilage, the mantle and the internal anatomy. A rather arbitrary criterion is currently used to distinguish between the two genera. The large species with a strong callus are placed in Prunum, the slender species with a thin callus in Volvarina, leaving in between many ambiguous species. To date (2010) there is no phylogenetic analysis behind the current generic placements

== Species ==
Species within the genus Prunum include:

- Prunum abyssorum (Tomlin, 1916)
- Prunum adelantado Espinosa & Ortea, 2018
- Prunum aikeni T. Cossignani, 2018
- Prunum aitanae Espinosa & Ortea, 2019
- Prunum albertoangelai Cossignani, 2005
- Prunum albertoi Espinosa & Ortea, 1998
- Prunum albuminosa (Dall, 1919)
- Prunum aletes Roth, 1978
- Prunum amabile (Redfield, 1852)
- Prunum amphorale de Souza, 1992
- Prunum amygdalum (Kiener, 1841)
- Prunum annulatum (Reeve, 1865)
- Prunum antillanum (Sarasúa, 1992)
- Prunum apicinum (Menke, 1828)
- Prunum arangoi Espinosa & Ortea, 2015
- Prunum bahiense (Tomlin 1917)
- Prunum batabanoense Espinosa & Ortea, 2002
- Prunum bayonai Cossignani, 2009
- Prunum beali (McGinty, 1940)
- Prunum bellulum (Dall, 1890)
- Prunum boreale (A. E. Verrill, 1884)
- Prunum cahuitaense Magaña, Espinosa & Ortea, 2003
- Prunum caledonicum Cossignani, 2001
- Prunum camachoi Espinosa & Ortea, 2003
- Prunum canasense Espinosa, Moro & Ortea, 2011
- Prunum caneli Espinosa, Ortea & Fernadez-Garcés, 2007
- Prunum canilla (Dall, 1927)
- Prunum capense (Krauss, 1848)
- Prunum carneum (Storer, 1837)
- Prunum cassis (Dall, 1889)
- Prunum catochense Cossignani, 2004
- Prunum chagosi Hayes & Boyer, 1997
- Prunum chumi Espinosa & Ortea, 2000
- Prunum cinctum (Kiener, 1834)
- Prunum cineraceum (Dall, 1889)
- Prunum circumvittatum (Weisbord, 1962)
- Prunum coltrorum Cossignani, 2005
- Prunum conchibellum Espinosa, Ortea & Moro, 2010
- Prunum cubanum Sarasúa & Espinosa, 1977
- Prunum curtum (G.B. Sowerby, 1832)
- Prunum damasoi Cossignani, 2006
- Prunum dawnbrinkae Massier, 1993
- Prunum egmontense Espinosa & Ortea, 2015
- Prunum dinisioi Cossignani, 2006
- Prunum enriquevidali Espinosa & Ortea, 1995
- Prunum estafaniae Pérez-Dionis, Ortea & Espinosa, 2009
- Prunum evelynae (Bayer, 1943)
- Prunum flori Espinosa, Ortea & Moro, 2010
- Prunum frumari Petuch & Sargent, 2012
- Prunum fulminatum (Kiener, 1841)
- Prunum gijon Espinosa & Ortea, 2006
- Prunum goliat Espinosa, Moro & Ortea, 2011
- Prunum gorgonense Roth, 1978
- Prunum gregorioi Espinosa & Ortea, 2018
- Prunum guttatum (Dillwyn, 1817)
- Prunum hartleyanum (Schwengel, 1941)
- Prunum holandae Espinosa & Ortea, 1999
- Prunum humboldti Espinosa, Ortea & Moro, 2009
- Prunum hunabi Espinosa & Ortea, 2015
- Prunum ianusi Espinosa & Ortea, 2015
- Prunum javii Espinosa, Ortea & Moro, 2013
- Prunum josealejandroi Espinosa, Moro & Ortea, 2011
- Prunum labiatum (Kiener, 1841)
- Prunum labrosum (Redfield, 1870)
- Prunum lalanai Espinosa & Ortea, 2013
- Prunum leonardhilli Petuch, 1990
- Prunum lipei (Clover, 1990)
- Prunum lizanoi Magana, Espinosa & Ortea, 2003
- Prunum lorenae Espinosa & Ortea, 2013
- Prunum macleani Roth, 1978
- Prunum magliaroi T. Cossignani & Lorenz, 2021
- Prunum magnificum (Sarasúa, 1989)
- Prunum marginatum (Born, 1778)
- Prunum mariateresae Cossignani, 2009
- Prunum martini (Petit, 1853)
- Prunum mingueloi Espinosa & Ortea, 2013
- Prunum montseae Espinosa, Ortea & Moro, 2014
- Prunum nataliae Pérez-Dionis, Ortea & Espinosa, 2009
- Prunum negoi Cossignani, 2005
- Prunum niciezai Espinosa & Ortea, 1998
- Prunum nivosum (Hinds, 1844)
- Prunum nobilianum (Bayer, 1943)
- Prunum oblongum (Swainson, 1829) (nomen dubium)
- Prunum olivaeforme (Kiener, 1834)
- Prunum pacotalaverai Espinosa, Ortea & Moro, 2014
- Prunum pellucidum (Pfeiffer, 1840)
- Prunum pinerum Sarasúa & Espinosa, 1977
- Prunum poeyi Espinosa & Ortea, 2015
- Prunum poulosi Lipe, 1996
- Prunum pruinosum (Hinds, 1844)
- Prunum prunum (Gmelin, 1791)
- Prunum pulchrum (Gray, 1839)
- Prunum pulidoi Espinosa & Ortea, 1999
- Prunum pyrumoides Lussi & Smith, 1999
- Prunum quelimanensis Bozzetti, 2001
- Prunum quini Ortea & Espinosa, 2018
- Prunum quinteroi Espinosa & Ortea, 1999
- Prunum redfieldii (Tryon, 1882)
- Prunum roosevelti (Bartsch & Rehder, 1939)
- Prunum rosasi Espinosa & Ortea, 2018
- Prunum roscidum (Redfield, 1860)
- Prunum rostratum (Redfield, 1870)
- Prunum rubens (Martens, 1881)
- Prunum sapotilla (Hinds, 1844)
- Prunum saulcyanum (Petit, 1851)
- † Prunum seriaense Harzhauser, Raven & Landau, 2018
- Prunum similerato Ortega & Gofas, 2019
- Prunum smalli Espinosa & Ortea, 2002
- Prunum storeria (Couthouy, 1837)
- Prunum succineum (Conrad, 1846)
- Prunum sunderlandorum Petuch & Berschauer, 2020
- Prunum tacoense Espinosa & Ortea, 2014
- Prunum tethys Lussi & Smith, 1999
- Prunum thalassicola Espinosa, Ortea & Fernadez-Garcés, 2007
- Prunum torticulum (Dall, 1881)
- Prunum triangulum Lussi & G. Smith, 2015
- Prunum virginianum (Conrad, 1868)
- Prunum walvisianum (Tomlin, 1920)
- Prunum woodbridgei (Hertlein & Strong, 1951)

Species brought into synonymy

- Prunum abbreviatum (C.B. Adams, 1850) : synonym of Volvarina lactea (Kiener, 1841)
- Prunum adelum (Thiele, 1925) : synonym of Volvarina adela (Thiele, 1925)
- Prunum aguayoi Ortea & Espinosa, 1996 : synonym of Prunum lipei (Clover, 1990)
- Prunum agulhasensis Thiele, 1925 : synonym of Hydroginella agulhasensis (Thiele, 1925)
- Prunum alabaster Reeve, 1865 : synonym of Volvarina rubella navicella Reeve, 1865
- Prunum ameliensis (Tomlin 1917) : synonym of Volvarina ameliensis (Tomlin, 1917)
- Prunum attenuatum (Reeve, 1865) : synonym of Volvarina attenuata (Reeve, 1865)
- Prunum augusta (Thiele, 1925): synonym of Dentimargo augusta (Thiele, 1925)
- Prunum avenacea (Deshayes, 1844): synonym of Prunum bellulum (Dall, 1890)
- Prunum avenella (Dall, 1881): synonym of Volvarina avenella (Dall, 1881)
- Prunum bahiensis [sic]: synonym of Prunum bahiense (Tomlin, 1917) (incorrect gender ending)
- Prunum avenellum (Dall, 1881): synonym of Volvarina avenella (Dall, 1881)
- Prunum batabanoensis Espinosa & Ortea, 2002: synonym of Prunum batabanoense Espinosa & Ortea, 2002
- Prunum bellum (Conrad, 1868): synonym of Prunum avenacea (Deshayes, 1844)
- Prunum caerulescens Lamarck, 1822 : synonym of Prunum prunum (Gmelin, 1791)
- Prunum cahuitaensis Magaña, Espinosa & Ortea, 2003: synonym of Prunum cahuitaense Magaña, Espinosa & Ortea, 2003 (incorrect gender ending)
- Prunum canasensis Espinosa, Moro & Ortea, 2011: synonym of Prunum canasense Espinosa, Moro & Ortea, 2011 (incorrect gender agreement of specific epithet)
- Prunum canellum (Jousseaume, 1875): synonym of Prunum rostratum (Redfield, 1870)
- Prunum cantharus Reeve, 1865 : synonym of Prunum capense (Krauss, 1848)
- Prunum capensis (Krauss, 1848) : synonym of Prunum capense (Krauss, 1848)
- Prunum carnum Storer, 1837 : synonym of Prunum carneum (Storer, 1837)
- Prunum charbarensis (Melvill, 1897) : synonym of Volvarina charbarensis (Melvill, 1897)
- Prunum colomborum Bozzetti, 1995 : synonym of Marginella colomborum (Bozzetti, 1995)
- Prunum conchibellus Espinosa, Ortea & Moro, 2010 : synonym of Prunum conchibellum Espinosa, Ortea & Moro, 2010
- Prunum crassilabrum (G.B. Sowerby I, 1846) : synonym of Prunum labrosum (Redfield, 1870)
- Prunum deliciosum (Bavay in Dautzenberg, 1912) : synonym of Volvarina deliciosa (Bavay in Dautzenberg, 1913)
- Prunum dinisioi T. Cossignani, 2006: synonym of Volvarina dinisioi (T. Cossignani, 2006) (original combination)
- Prunum egmontensis [sic]: synonym of Prunum egmontense Espinosa & Ortea, 2015 (original spelling: incorrect gender agreement of specific epithet)
- Prunum evax Li, 1930 : synonym of Prunum sapotilla (Hinds, 1844)
- Prunum exile (Gmelin, 1791) : synonym of Volvarina exilis (Gmelin, 1791)
- Prunum fortunatum (Clover & Macca, 1990): synonym of Volvarina fortunata Clover & Macca, 1990
- Prunum fraterculus E.A. Smith, 1915 : synonym of Prunum martini (Petit, 1853)
- Prunum fulgidum Lussi & G. Smith, 1999: synonym of Volvarina fulgida (Lussi & G. Smith, 1999) (original combination)
- Prunum hartleyanum (Schwengel, 1941): synonym of Prunum virginianum hartleyana (Schwengel, 1941)
- Prunum helena Thiele, 1925 : synonym of Hyalina helena (Thiele, 1925)
- Prunum hoffi Moolenbeek & Faber, 1991 : synonym of Canalispira hoffi (Moolenbeek & Faber, 1991)
- Prunum hondurasense (Reeve, 1865) : synonym of Prunum pulchrum (Gray, 1839)
- Prunum hondurasensis (Reeve, 1865) : synonym of Prunum pulchrum (Gray, 1839)
- Prunum insulanum (Gofas & Fernandes, 1988) : synonym of Volvarina insulana Gofas & Fernandes, 1988
- Prunum joubini Bavay, 1913: synonym of Prunum bahiense (Tomlin, 1917)
- Prunum keenii Marrat, 1871: synonym of Hyalina keenii (Marrat, 1871)
- Prunum laetitium (Thiele, 1925): synonym of Volvarina laetitia (Thiele, 1925)
- Prunum longivaricosum Lamarck, 1822: synonym of Prunum guttatum (Dillwyn, 1817)
- Prunum mabellae (Melvill & Standen, 1901): synonym of Volvarina mabellae (Melvill & Standen, 1901)
- Prunum marianae Bozzetti, 1999: synonym of Prunum pyrumoides Lussi & G. Smith, 1999
- Prunum monile (Linnaeus, 1758): synonym of Volvarina monilis (Linnaeus, 1758)
- Prunum olivaeformis (Kiener, 1834): synonym of Prunum olivaeforme (Kiener, 1834)
- Prunum pergrande (Clover, 1974): synonym of Volvarina pergrandis Clover, 1974
- Prunum pergrandis [sic]: synonym of Prunum pergrande (Clover, 1974): synonym of Volvarina pergrandis Clover, 1974 (incorrect gender ending)
- Prunum riparia Gofas & Fernandes, 1992: synonym of Volvarina riparia Gofas & Fernandes, 1992
- Prunum roberti (Bavay, 1917): synonym of Volvarina roberti (Bavay, 1917)
- Prunum roosevelti Bartsch & Rehder, 1939 : synonym of Prunum amabile (Redfield, 1852)
- Prunum sauliae (G. B. Sowerby II, 1846): synonym of Volvarina sauliae (G. B. Sowerby II, 1846)
- Prunum serrei Bavay, 1913 : synonym of Volvarina serrei (Bavay, 1913)
- Prunum sowerbyanum Petit, 1851 : synonym of Prunum monile (Linnaeus, 1758)
- Prunum styrium Dall, 1889 : synonym of Volvarina styria (Dall, 1889)
- Prunum succinea (Conrad, 1846): synonym of Prunum succineum (Conrad, 1846)
- Prunum tacoensis Espinosa & Ortea, 2014: synonym of Prunum tacoense Espinosa & Ortea, 2014
- Prunum terverianum (Petit de la Saussaye, 1851): synonym of Volvarina monilis (Linnaeus, 1758)
- Prunum watsoni (Dall, 1881): synonym of Eratoidea watsoni (Dall, 1881)
- Prunum yucatecana (Dall, 1881): synonym of Dentimargo yucatecanus (Dall, 1881): synonym of Dentimargo yucatecana (Dall, 1881)
