= M. laeta =

M. laeta may refer to:

- Marginella laeta, a margin snail
- Megachile laeta, a leafcutter bee
- Meromyza laeta, a grass fly
- Mimacraea laeta, an African butterfly
- Mitromorpha laeta, a sea snail
- Musurgina laeta, an owlet moth
- Myrmarachne laeta, an antmimicking spider
