= Volvarina fanabeensis =

Scientific classification
- Kingdom: Animalia
- Phylum: Mollusca
- Class: Gastropoda
- Subclass: Caenogastropoda
- Order: Neogastropoda
- Family: Marginellidae
- Subfamily: Marginellinae
- Genus: Volvarina
- Species: V. fanabeensis

Binomial name
- Volvarina fanabeensis Espinosa, Ortea & Pérez-Dionis, 2014

Species of gastropod

Volvarina fanabeensis is a species of sea snail, a marine gastropod mollusk in the family Marginellidae, the margin snails.

== Description ==
Volvarina fanabeensis is a small, slender marine gastropod in the family Marginellidae. The shell is smooth, glossy, and elongated, reaching about 8.2 mm in length and 2.87 mm in width. It has a subcylindrical shape with a slightly convex left side and nearly straight right side.

The spire is extended and blunt, consisting of four whorls, with the last whorl making up approximately two-thirds of the total shell length. The aperture is long and narrow, widening slightly at the front near the four columellar folds, the anterior two being more prominent. The outer lip is thin and inserted below the suture of the previous whorl.

The shell has a pale, translucent pinkish-white color that is nearly uniform. This species is distinguished from others in the Volvarina roberti complex by its particularly narrow and elongated form.

== Distribution ==
This marine species occurs in the Atlantic Ocean off the Canary Islands.
