= Prunum damasoi =

Scientific classification
- Kingdom: Animalia
- Phylum: Mollusca
- Class: Gastropoda
- Subclass: Caenogastropoda
- Order: Neogastropoda
- Family: Marginellidae
- Genus: Prunum
- Species: P. damasoi

Binomial name
- Prunum damasoi Cossignani, 2006

Species of gastropod

Prunum damasoi is a species of sea snail, a marine gastropod mollusk in the family Marginellidae, the margin snails.
