= Prunum abyssorum =

Scientific classification
- Kingdom: Animalia
- Phylum: Mollusca
- Class: Gastropoda
- Subclass: Caenogastropoda
- Order: Neogastropoda
- Family: Marginellidae
- Genus: Prunum
- Species: P. abyssorum

Binomial name
- Prunum abyssorum (Tomlin, 1916)

Synonyms
- Dentimargo abyssorum (Tomlin, 1916) (original combination); Marginella abyssorum Tomlin, 1916; Marginella seminula Dall, 1881 (Objective synonym of valid name (Marginella seminula Gould, 1860))

Species of gastropod

Prunum abyssorum is a species of sea snail, a marine gastropod mollusk in the family Marginellidae, the margin snails.

== Distribution ==
P. abyssorum can be found in the Gulf of Mexico, off the coast of Yucatan.
