= Prunum redfieldii =

Scientific classification
- Kingdom: Animalia
- Phylum: Mollusca
- Class: Gastropoda
- Subclass: Caenogastropoda
- Order: Neogastropoda
- Family: Marginellidae
- Genus: Prunum
- Species: P. redfieldii

Binomial name
- Prunum redfieldii (Tryon, 1882)

Species of gastropod

Prunum redfieldii is a species of sea snail, a marine gastropod mollusk in the family Marginellidae, the margin snails.

== Distribution ==
P. redfieldii can be found in the waters off the Florida Keys.
