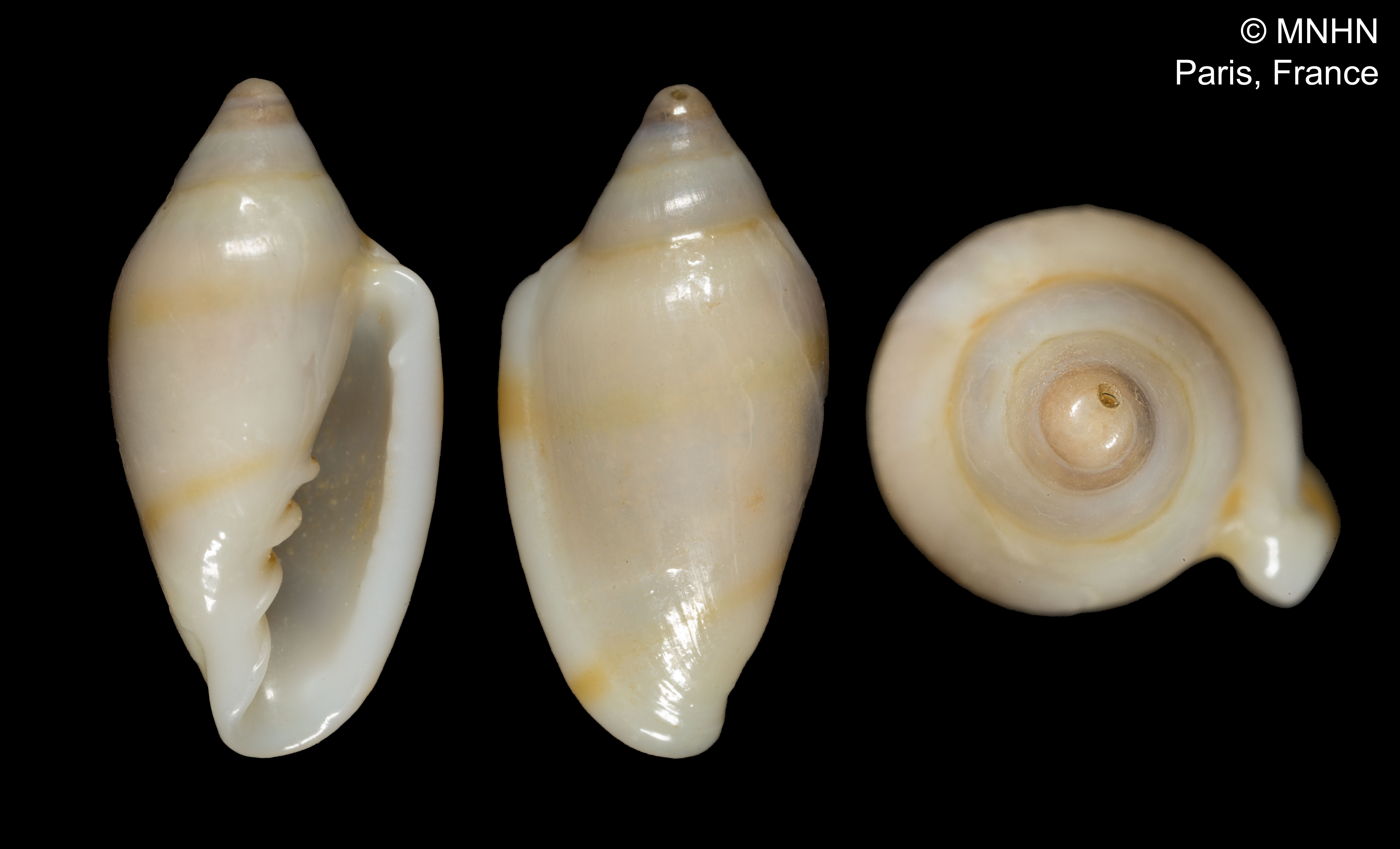
- Shell of Prunum caledonicum (holotype at MNHN, Paris)

Scientific classification
- Kingdom: Animalia
- Phylum: Mollusca
- Class: Gastropoda
- Subclass: Caenogastropoda
- Order: Neogastropoda
- Family: Marginellidae
- Genus: Prunum
- Species: P. caledonicum

Binomial name
- Prunum caledonicum Cossignani, 2001

= Prunum caledonicum =

Species of gastropod

Prunum caledonicum is a species of sea snail, a marine gastropod mollusk in the family Marginellidae, named the margin snails.

== Distribution ==
This marine species occurs off New Caledonia.
