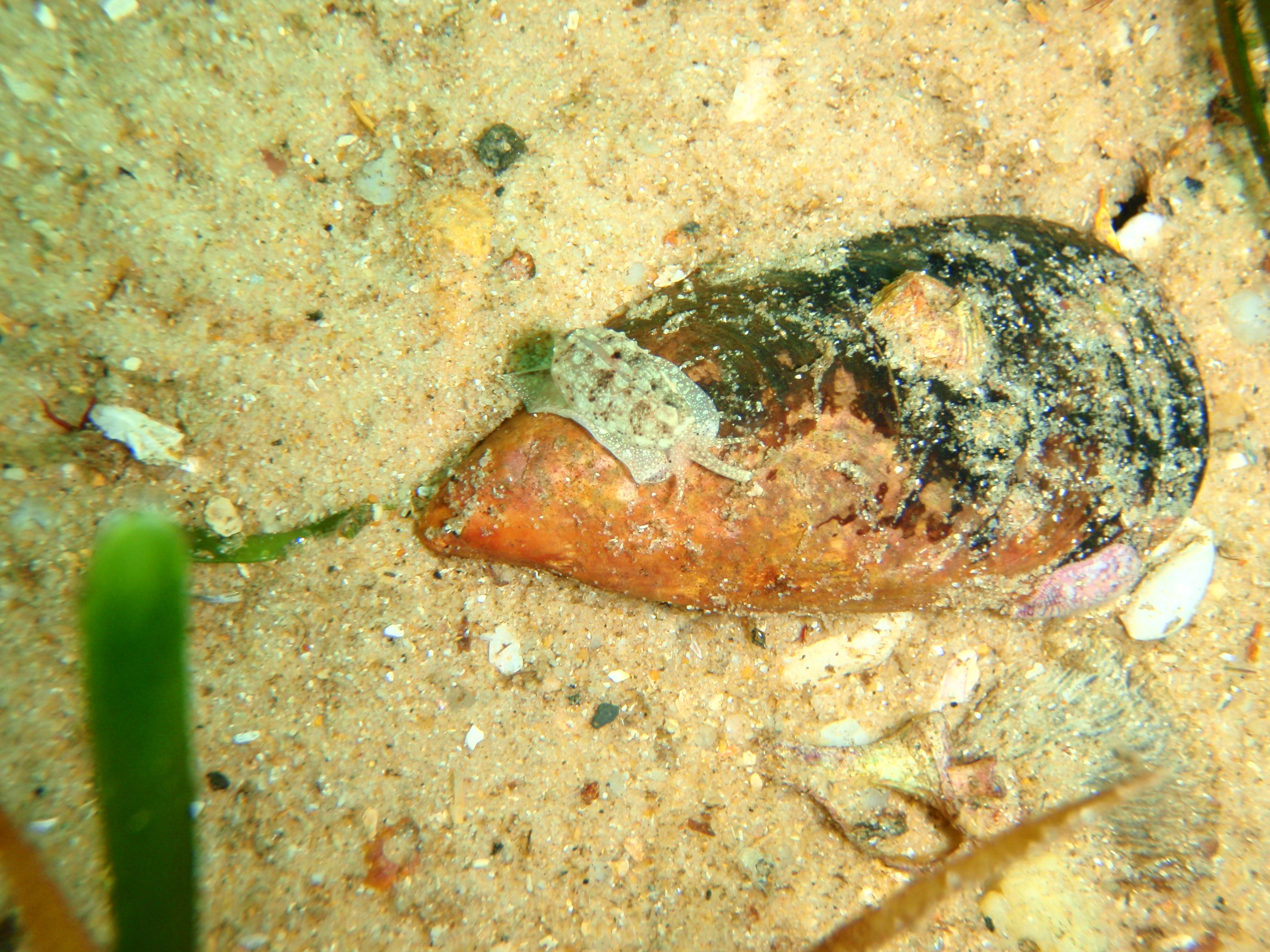
- Prunum capense at Long Beach, Simon's Town

Scientific classification
- Kingdom: Animalia
- Phylum: Mollusca
- Class: Gastropoda
- Subclass: Caenogastropoda
- Order: Neogastropoda
- Family: Marginellidae
- Genus: Prunum
- Species: P. capense

Binomial name
- Prunum capense (Krauss, 1848)

Synonyms
- Marginella cantharus Reeve, 1865; Marginella capensis Krauss, 1848 (original combination); Prunum cantharus (Reeve, 1865); Prunum capensis [sic] (incorrect gender ending); ¨Prunum capensis (Krauss, 1848) (incorrect grammatical agreement of specific epithet); Volvarina capensis (Krauss, 1848); Volvarina puella Gould, 1861

= Prunum capense =

Species of gastropod

Prunum capense, common name the Cape marginella, is a species of sea snail, a marine gastropod mollusk in the family Marginellidae, the margin snails.
