= Prunum albertoangelai =

Scientific classification
- Kingdom: Animalia
- Phylum: Mollusca
- Class: Gastropoda
- Subclass: Caenogastropoda
- Order: Neogastropoda
- Family: Marginellidae
- Genus: Prunum
- Species: P. albertoangelai

Binomial name
- Prunum albertoangelai Cossignani, 2005

Species of gastropod

Prunum albertoangelai is a species of sea snail, a marine gastropod mollusk in the family Marginellidae, the margin snails. This species was named after the famous Italian scientific journalist Alberto Angela.

== Distribution ==
This species is distributed in the Caribbean Sea along Colombia.
