= Prunum lipei =

Scientific classification
- Kingdom: Animalia
- Phylum: Mollusca
- Class: Gastropoda
- Subclass: Caenogastropoda
- Order: Neogastropoda
- Family: Marginellidae
- Genus: Prunum
- Species: P. lipei

Binomial name
- Prunum lipei (Clover, 1990)

Synonyms
- Bullata lipei Clover, 1990 (basionym); Prunum aguayoi Ortea & Espinosa, 1996

Species of gastropod

Prunum lipei is a species of sea snail, a marine gastropod mollusk in the family Marginellidae, the margin snails.

== Description ==
Original description of holotype: "Shell of medium size for the genus, cylindrically ovate; polished ivory in color throughout with just a hint of a light brown band around the center of the body whorl. Spire completely involuted; aperture narrow, of constant width and running full length of the shell; outer lip smooth, slightly reflected, mostly straight but arched posteriorly well above the spire, finely denticulate along most of its length. Four weak oblique folds equally spaced on the anterior half of the columella, the anterior fold being the strongest."

== Distribution ==
Locus typicus: "Off Cabo Catoche, Yucatan, Gulf of Mexico."

Prunum lipei can be found in Caribbean waters, ranging from Campeche Bank to Quintana Roo, and in the Gulf of Mexico.
