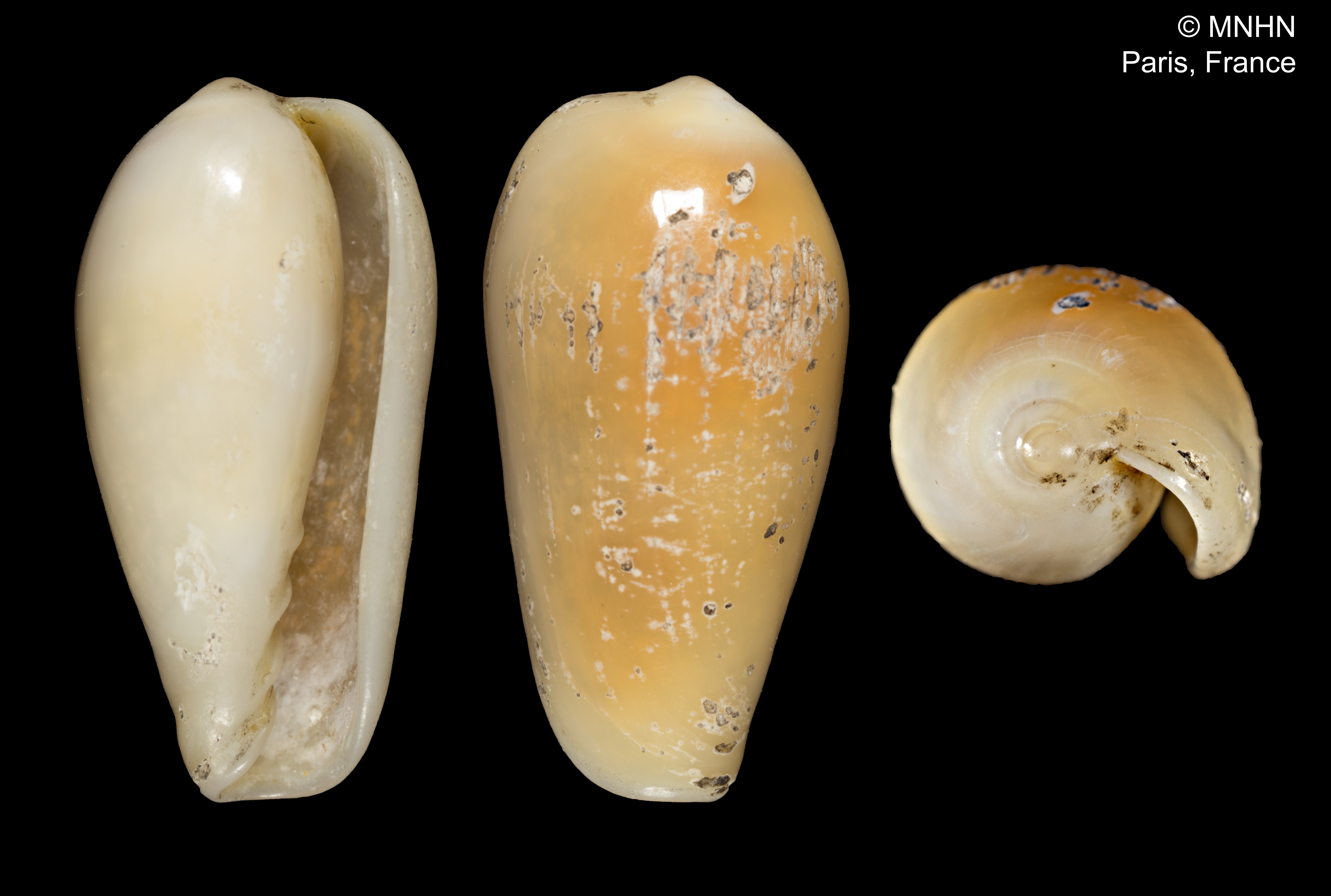
- Shell of Prunum rostratum (syntype at MNHN, Paris)

Scientific classification
- Kingdom: Animalia
- Phylum: Mollusca
- Class: Gastropoda
- Subclass: Caenogastropoda
- Order: Neogastropoda
- Family: Marginellidae
- Genus: Prunum
- Species: P. rostratum

Binomial name
- Prunum rostratum (Redfield, 1870)

Synonyms
- Egouena canella Jousseaume, 1875; Marginella rostrata Redfield, 1870 (original combination); Prunum canellum (Jousseaume, 1875)

= Prunum rostratum =

Species of gastropod

Prunum rostratum is a species of sea snail, a marine gastropod mollusk in the family Marginellidae, the margin snails.

== Distribution ==
P. rostratum can be found in Caribbean waters, ranging from Campeche to Panama.
