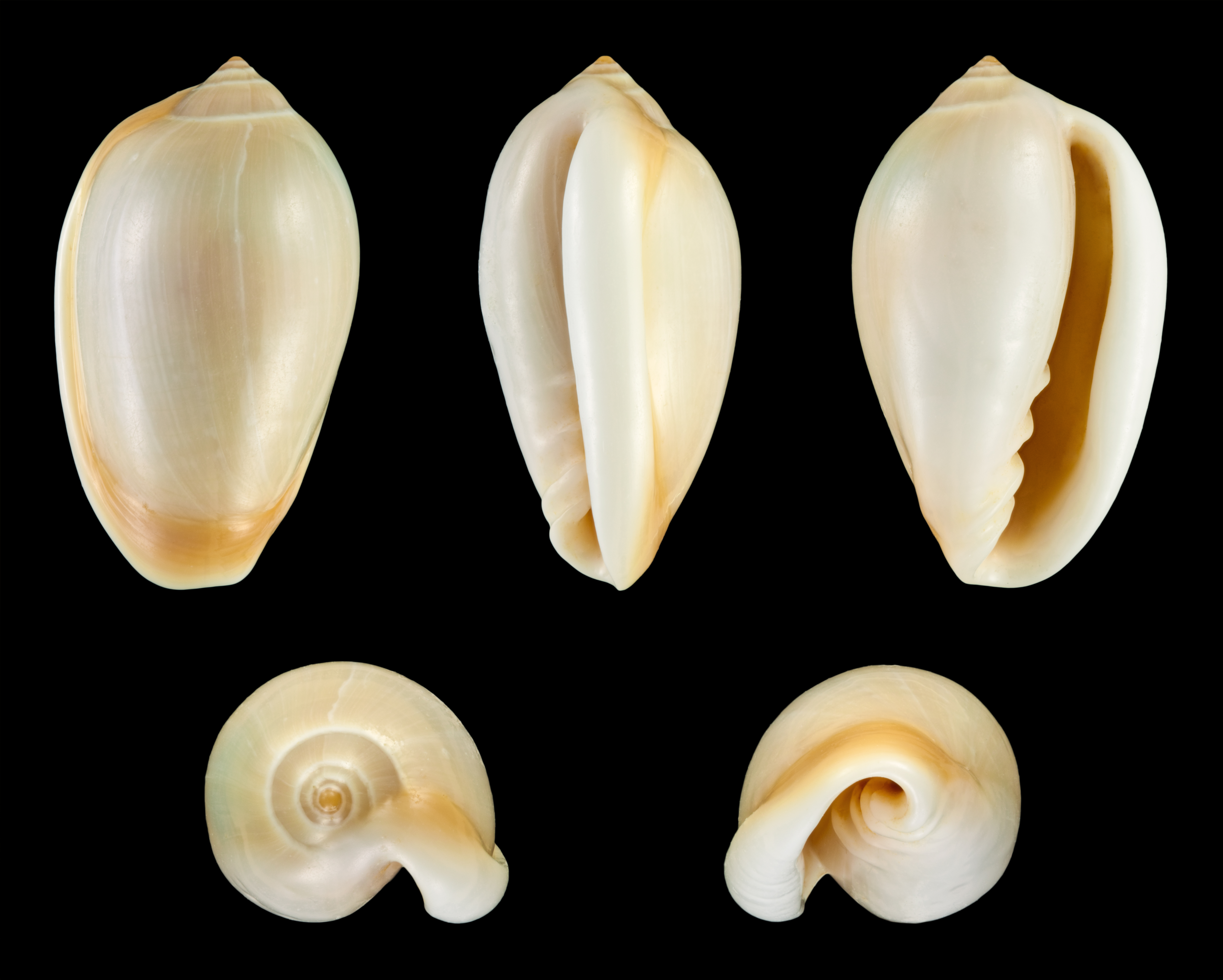
- Shell of Prunum amygdalum

Scientific classification
- Kingdom: Animalia
- Phylum: Mollusca
- Class: Gastropoda
- Subclass: Caenogastropoda
- Order: Neogastropoda
- Family: Marginellidae
- Genus: Prunum
- Species: P. amygdalum

Binomial name
- Prunum amygdalum (Kiener, 1841)

Synonyms
- Egouena egouen Jousseaume, 1875; Marginella amygdala Kiener, 1841 (basionym); Marginella gambiensis Redfield, 1851 (nomen dubium)

= Prunum amygdalum =

Species of gastropod

Prunum amygdalum, common name : the almond marginella, is a species of sea snail, a marine gastropod mollusk in the family Marginellidae, the margin snails.

== Description ==
The shell size varies between 8 mm and 22 mm.

== Distribution ==
This species occurs in the Atlantic Ocean off the coast of Senegal.
