= Prunum thalassicola =

Scientific classification
- Kingdom: Animalia
- Phylum: Mollusca
- Class: Gastropoda
- Subclass: Caenogastropoda
- Order: Neogastropoda
- Family: Marginellidae
- Genus: Prunum
- Species: P. thalassicola

Binomial name
- Prunum thalassicola Espinosa, Ortea & Fernadez-Garcés, 2007

Species of gastropod

Prunum thalassicola is a species of sea snail, a marine gastropod mollusk in the family Marginellidae, the margin snails.

Members of the order Neogastropoda are mostly gonochoric and broadcast spawners. Life cycle: Embryos develop into planktonic trochophore larvae and later into juvenile veligers before becoming fully grown adults.
