= Prunum virginianum =

Scientific classification
- Kingdom: Animalia
- Phylum: Mollusca
- Class: Gastropoda
- Subclass: Caenogastropoda
- Order: Neogastropoda
- Family: Marginellidae
- Genus: Prunum
- Species: P. virginianum

Binomial name
- Prunum virginianum (Conrad, 1868)

Synonyms
- Marginella virginiana Conrad, 1868 (basionym)

Species of gastropod

Prunum virginianum is a species of sea snail, a marine gastropod mollusk in the family Marginellidae, the margin snails.

== Subspecies ==
- Prunum virginianum hartleyana (Schwengel, 1941) (synonyms : Prunum hartleyanum (Schwengel, 1941); Marginella hartleyana Schwengel, 1941)
