= Prunum cineraceum =

Scientific classification
- Kingdom: Animalia
- Phylum: Mollusca
- Class: Gastropoda
- Subclass: Caenogastropoda
- Order: Neogastropoda
- Family: Marginellidae
- Genus: Prunum
- Species: P. cineraceum

Binomial name
- Prunum cineraceum Dall, 1889

Species of gastropod

Prunum cineraceum is a species of gastropods from the Marginellidae family. The scientific name of this species was first published in 1889 by Dall.
