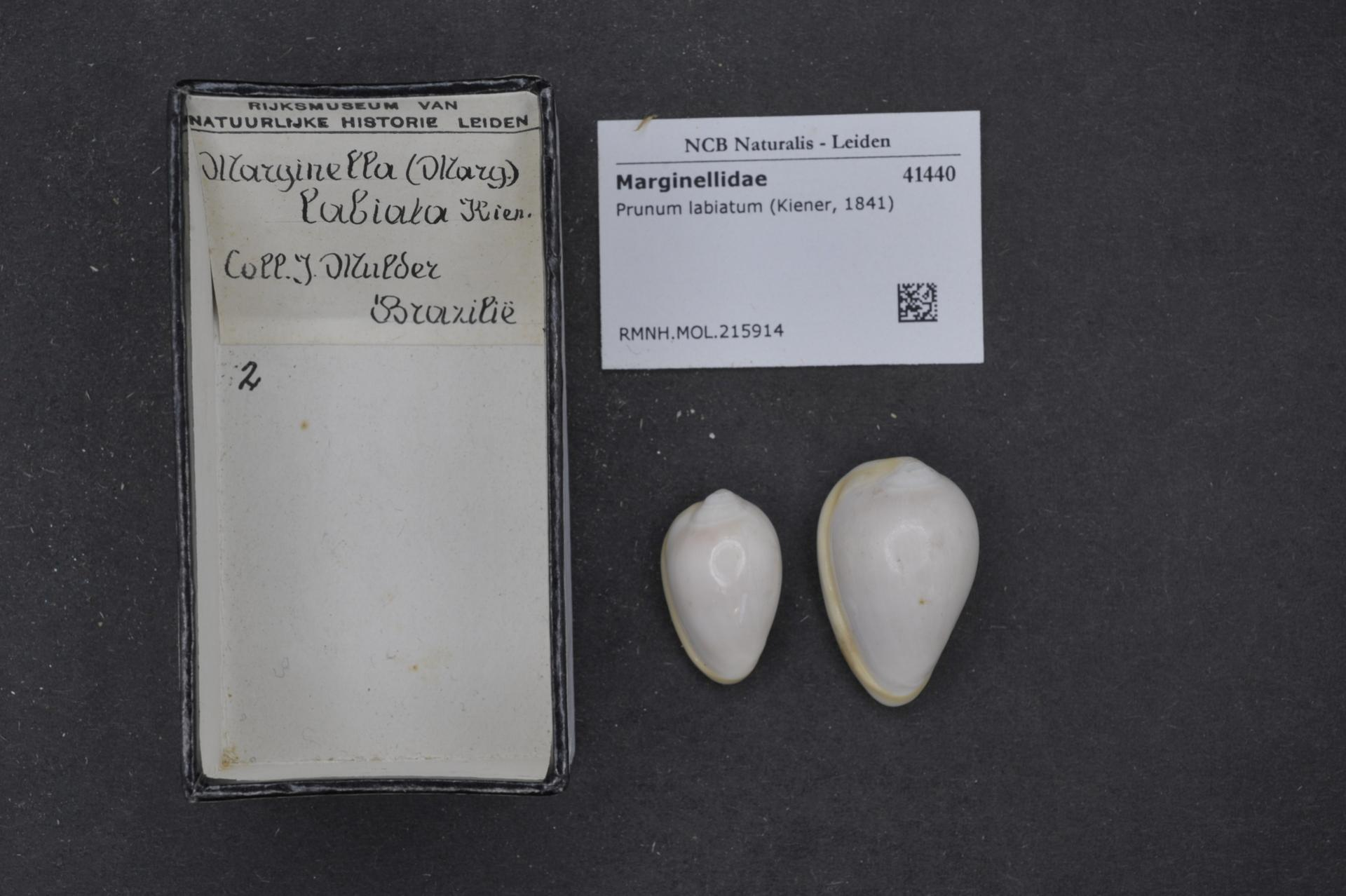

Scientific classification
- Kingdom: Animalia
- Phylum: Mollusca
- Class: Gastropoda
- Subclass: Caenogastropoda
- Order: Neogastropoda
- Family: Marginellidae
- Genus: Prunum
- Species: P. labiatum

Binomial name
- Prunum labiatum (Kiener, 1841)

= Prunum labiatum =

Species of gastropod

Prunum labiatum is a species of sea snail, a marine gastropod mollusk in the family Marginellidae, the margin snails.

== Distribution ==
P. labiatum can be found in Caribbean waters, ranging from Campeche to Quintana Roo.
