= Prunum cahuitaense =

Scientific classification
- Kingdom: Animalia
- Phylum: Mollusca
- Class: Gastropoda
- Subclass: Caenogastropoda
- Order: Neogastropoda
- Family: Marginellidae
- Genus: Prunum
- Species: P. cahuitaense

Binomial name
- Prunum cahuitaense Magana, Espinosa & Ortea, 2003

Synonyms
- Prunum cahuitaensis Magaña, Espinosa & Ortea, 2003 (incorrect gender ending)

Species of gastropod

Prunum cahuitaense is a species of sea snail, a marine gastropod mollusk in the family Marginellidae, the margin snails.

== Distribution ==
This species occurs in the Caribbean Sea off Costa Rica.
