= Volvarina rubella =

Scientific classification
- Kingdom: Animalia
- Phylum: Mollusca
- Class: Gastropoda
- Subclass: Caenogastropoda
- Order: Neogastropoda
- Family: Marginellidae
- Subfamily: Marginellinae
- Genus: Volvarina
- Species: V. rubella

Binomial name
- Volvarina rubella (C. B. Adams, 1845)

Synonyms
- Marginella rubella C. B. Adams, 1845 ·

Species of gastropod

Volvarina rubella is a species of sea snail, a marine gastropod mollusk in the family Marginellidae, the margin snails.

Subspecies

- Volvarina rubella navicella (Reeve, 1865): synonym of Volvarina taeniata (G. B. Sowerby II, 1846)

== Description ==
The length of the shell attains 11.2 mm.

(Original description in Latin) The thin shell is elongated and shows three red bands. The shell contains four whorls. The spire has a crystalline shine. The white inner lip contains four plaits. The aperture becomes narrower above.

== Distribution ==
This marine species is endemic to Jamaica, Caribbean Sea; also off the Cape Verde
