= Prunum niciezai =

Scientific classification
- Kingdom: Animalia
- Phylum: Mollusca
- Class: Gastropoda
- Subclass: Caenogastropoda
- Order: Neogastropoda
- Family: Marginellidae
- Genus: Prunum
- Species: P. niciezai

Binomial name
- Prunum niciezai Espinosa & Ortea, 1998

Species of gastropod

Prunum niciezai is a species of sea snail, a marine gastropod mollusk in the family Marginellidae, the margin snails.

== Distribution ==
P. niciezai can be found in Caribbean waters, off the northwestern coast of Cuba.
