= Prunum cassis =

Scientific classification
- Kingdom: Animalia
- Phylum: Mollusca
- Class: Gastropoda
- Subclass: Caenogastropoda
- Order: Neogastropoda
- Family: Marginellidae
- Genus: Prunum
- Species: P. cassis

Binomial name
- Prunum cassis (Dall, 1889)

Species of gastropod

Prunum cassis is a species of sea snail, a marine gastropod mollusc in the family Marginellidae.

== Distribution ==
P. cassis can be found in Caribbean waters, ranging from western Florida to Cuba.
