= Prunum boreale =

Scientific classification
- Kingdom: Animalia
- Phylum: Mollusca
- Class: Gastropoda
- Subclass: Caenogastropoda
- Order: Neogastropoda
- Family: Marginellidae
- Genus: Prunum
- Species: P. boreale

Binomial name
- Prunum boreale (A. E. Verrill, 1884)

Species of gastropod

Prunum boreale, common name the boreal marginella, is a species of sea snail, a marine gastropod mollusk in the family Marginellidae, the margin snails.
