= Prunum pulidoi =

Scientific classification
- Kingdom: Animalia
- Phylum: Mollusca
- Class: Gastropoda
- Subclass: Caenogastropoda
- Order: Neogastropoda
- Family: Marginellidae
- Genus: Prunum
- Species: P. pulidoi

Binomial name
- Prunum pulidoi Espinosa & Ortea, 1999

Species of gastropod

Prunum pulidoi is a species of sea snail, a marine gastropod mollusk in the family Marginellidae, the margin snails.
