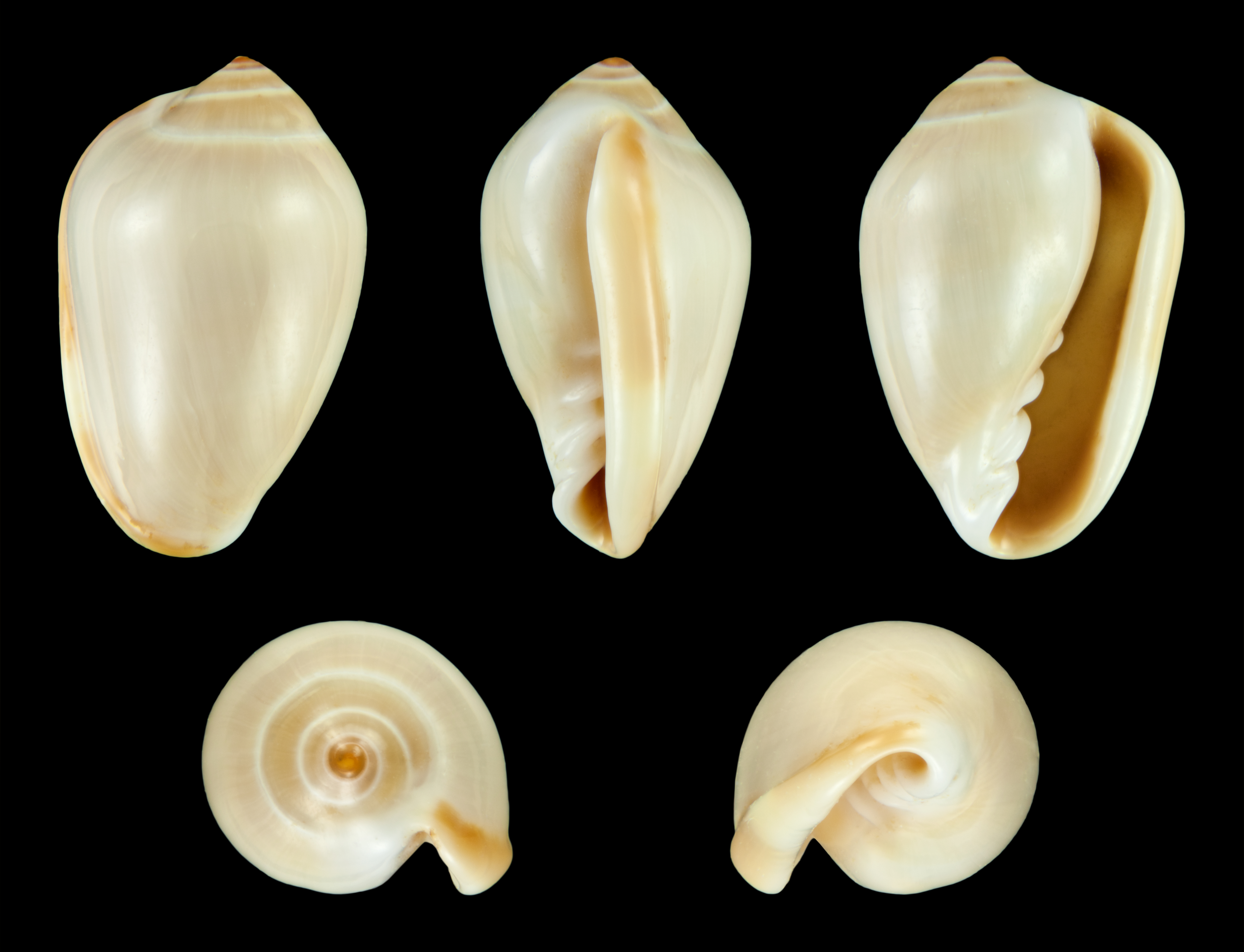

Scientific classification
- Kingdom: Animalia
- Phylum: Mollusca
- Class: Gastropoda
- Subclass: Caenogastropoda
- Order: Neogastropoda
- Family: Marginellidae
- Genus: Prunum
- Species: P. apicinum

Binomial name
- Prunum apicinum (Menke, 1828)

= Prunum apicinum =

Species of gastropod

Prunum apicinum is a species of small sea snail, a marine gastropod mollusk in the family Marginellidae, the margin snails.

== Distribution ==
P. apicinum can be found in Atlantic waters, ranging from North Carolina to the Virgin Islands.
