= Prunum bellulum =

Scientific classification
- Kingdom: Animalia
- Phylum: Mollusca
- Class: Gastropoda
- Subclass: Caenogastropoda
- Order: Neogastropoda
- Family: Marginellidae
- Genus: Prunum
- Species: P. bellulum

Binomial name
- Prunum bellulum (Dall, 1890)

Synonyms
- Marginella avenacea Deshayes, 1844 (basionym); Marginella bella Conrad, 1868; Porcellanella bella (Conrad, 1868); Prunum avenacea auct. (misspelling and misidentification); Prunum bellum Conrad, 1868; Prunum bellum var. bellulum Dall, 1890; Prunum bellum var. ineptum Dall, 1890; Volvarina avenacea (Deshayes, 1844)

Species of gastropod

Prunum bellulum is a species of sea snail, a marine gastropod mollusk in the family Marginellidae, the margin snails.

== Distribution ==
This species occurs in the Caribbean Sea and off the Lesser Antilles.
