= Prunum amabile =

Scientific classification
- Kingdom: Animalia
- Phylum: Mollusca
- Class: Gastropoda
- Subclass: Caenogastropoda
- Order: Neogastropoda
- Family: Marginellidae
- Genus: Prunum
- Species: P. amabile

Binomial name
- Prunum amabile (Redfield, 1852)

Synonyms
- Marginella amabilis Redfield, 1852 (basionym); Marginella roosevelti Bartsch & Rehder, 1939; Prunum roosevelti Bartsch & Rehder, 1939

Species of gastropod

Prunum amabile is a species of sea snail, a marine gastropod mollusk in the family Marginellidae, the margin snails.

== Distribution ==
P. amabile can be found in Atlantic waters, ranging from North Carolina to Brazil., in the Caribbean Sea and the Gulf of Mexico.
