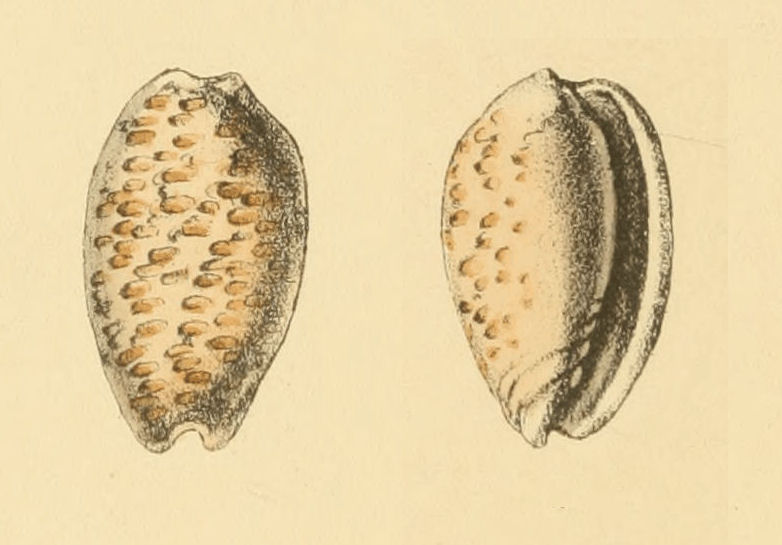

Scientific classification
- Kingdom: Animalia
- Phylum: Mollusca
- Class: Gastropoda
- Subclass: Caenogastropoda
- Order: Neogastropoda
- Family: Marginellidae
- Genus: Prunum
- Species: P. guttatum

Binomial name
- Prunum guttatum (Dillwyn, 1817)

= Prunum guttatum =

Species of gastropod

Prunum guttatum is a species of sea snail, a marine gastropod mollusk in the family Marginellidae, the margin snails.

== Description ==
The shell is oval with the spire concealed. It is covered with transverse oval spots margined with white, somewhat ocellate, and disposed longitudinally.

== Distribution ==
P. guttatum can be found in Caribbean waters, ranging from eastern Florida to Colombia and the Virgin Islands.
