= Prunum pyrumoides =

Scientific classification
- Kingdom: Animalia
- Phylum: Mollusca
- Class: Gastropoda
- Subclass: Caenogastropoda
- Order: Neogastropoda
- Family: Marginellidae
- Genus: Prunum
- Species: P. pyrumoides

Binomial name
- Prunum pyrumoides Lussi & Smith, 1999

Synonyms
- Marginella marianae Bozzetti, 1999; Prunum marianae (Bozzetti, 1999)

Species of gastropod

Prunum pyrumoides is a species of sea snail, a marine gastropod mollusk in the family Marginellidae, the margin snails.
