= Prunum batabanoense =

Scientific classification
- Kingdom: Animalia
- Phylum: Mollusca
- Class: Gastropoda
- Subclass: Caenogastropoda
- Order: Neogastropoda
- Family: Marginellidae
- Genus: Prunum
- Species: P. batabanoense

Binomial name
- Prunum batabanoense Espinosa & Ortea, 2002

Synonyms
- Prunum batabanoensis Espinosa & Ortea, 2002 (incorrect gender ending)

Species of gastropod

Prunum batabanoense is a species of sea snail, a marine gastropod mollusk in the family Marginellidae, the margin snails.

== Description ==
The shell grows to a length of 14 mm

== Distribution ==
This species occurs in the Caribbean Sea, south of Cuba.
