= Prunum catochense =

Scientific classification
- Kingdom: Animalia
- Phylum: Mollusca
- Class: Gastropoda
- Subclass: Caenogastropoda
- Order: Neogastropoda
- Family: Marginellidae
- Genus: Prunum
- Species: P. catochense

Binomial name
- Prunum catochense Cossignani, 2004

Species of gastropod

Prunum catochense is a species of sea snail, a marine gastropod mollusk in the family Marginellidae, the margin snails.

== Distribution ==
P. catochense can be found in the Gulf of Mexico, off the coast of Quintana Roo.
