= Prunum mariateresae =

Scientific classification
- Kingdom: Animalia
- Phylum: Mollusca
- Class: Gastropoda
- Subclass: Caenogastropoda
- Order: Neogastropoda
- Family: Marginellidae
- Genus: Prunum
- Species: P. mariateresae

Binomial name
- Prunum mariateresae Cossignani, 2009

Species of gastropod

Prunum mariateresae is a species of sea snail, a marine gastropod mollusk in the family Marginellidae, the margin snails.
