= Prunum smalli =

Scientific classification
- Kingdom: Animalia
- Phylum: Mollusca
- Class: Gastropoda
- Subclass: Caenogastropoda
- Order: Neogastropoda
- Family: Marginellidae
- Genus: Prunum
- Species: P. smalli

Binomial name
- Prunum smalli Espinosa & Ortea, 2002

Species of gastropod

Prunum smalli is a species of sea snail, a marine gastropod mollusk in the family Marginellidae, the margin snails. Commonly found in Cuba, Caribbean islands and Costa Rica.
