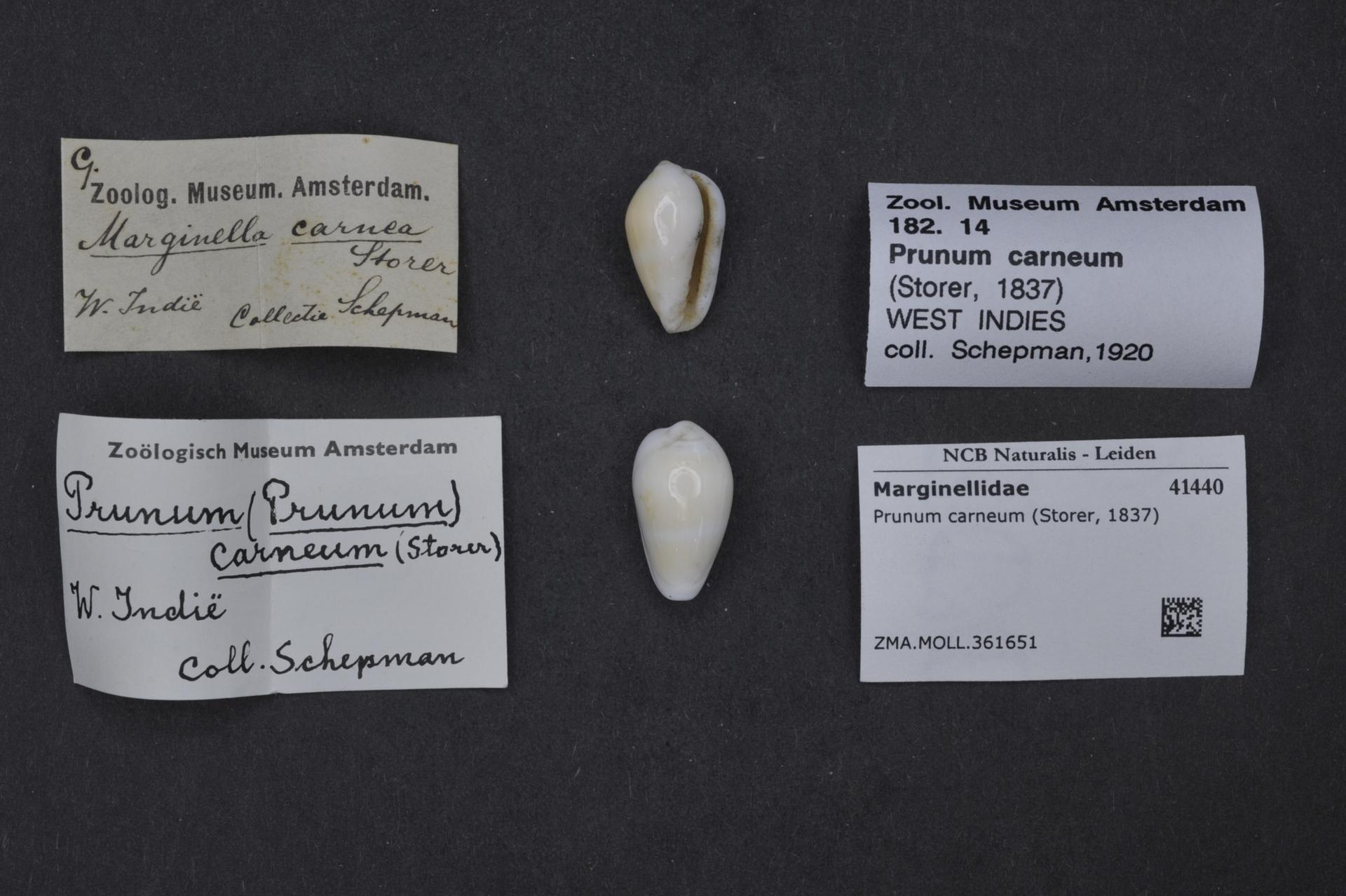

Scientific classification
- Kingdom: Animalia
- Phylum: Mollusca
- Class: Gastropoda
- Subclass: Caenogastropoda
- Order: Neogastropoda
- Family: Marginellidae
- Genus: Prunum
- Species: P. carneum

Binomial name
- Prunum carneum (Storer, 1837)

= Prunum carneum =

Species of gastropod

Prunum carneum is a species of sea snail, a marine gastropod mollusk in the family Marginellidae, the margin snails.

== Distribution ==
P. carneum can be found in Atlantic waters, ranging from eastern Florida to Venezuela.
