= Volvarina avenella =

Scientific classification
- Kingdom: Animalia
- Phylum: Mollusca
- Class: Gastropoda
- Subclass: Caenogastropoda
- Order: Neogastropoda
- Family: Marginellidae
- Genus: Volvarina
- Species: V. avenella

Binomial name
- Volvarina avenella (Dall, 1881)

Synonyms
- Marginella avenella Dall, 1881 (basionym); Prunum avenella (Dall, 1881)

Species of gastropod

Volvarina avenella is a species of sea snail, a marine gastropod mollusk in the family Marginellidae, the margin snails.

== Taxonomy ==
Dall considered Marginella avenella a synonym of Marginella succinea Conrad, 1846 (now considered a synonym of Prunum succineum (Conrad, 1846) ). These are actually two different species. He recognized this mistake afterwards.

== Description ==
This species occurs in the Gulf of Mexico.

== Distribution ==
Volvarina avenella can be found in Caribbean waters, ranging from the Florida Keys to Cuba.
