= Prunum camachoi =

Scientific classification
- Kingdom: Animalia
- Phylum: Mollusca
- Class: Gastropoda
- Subclass: Caenogastropoda
- Order: Neogastropoda
- Family: Marginellidae
- Genus: Prunum
- Species: P. camachoi

Binomial name
- Prunum camachoi Espinosa & Ortea, 2003

Species of gastropod

Prunum camachoi is a species of sea snail, a marine gastropod mollusk in the family Marginellidae, the margin snails.

== Distribution ==
This species is distributed in the Gulf of Mexico.
