= Volvarina fulgida =

Scientific classification
- Kingdom: Animalia
- Phylum: Mollusca
- Class: Gastropoda
- Subclass: Caenogastropoda
- Order: Neogastropoda
- Family: Marginellidae
- Genus: Volvarina
- Species: V. fulgida

Binomial name
- Volvarina fulgida (Lussi & Smith, 1999)

Synonyms
- Prunum fulgidum Lussi & G. Smith, 1999 (original combination)

Species of gastropod

Volvarina fulgida is a species of sea snail, a marine gastropod mollusk in the family Marginellidae, the margin snails.

== Description ==
The length of the shell attains 17.3 mm, its diameter is 18.3 mm.

== Distribution ==
This species occurs in the Indian Ocean off Durban, South Africa and off Mozambique.
