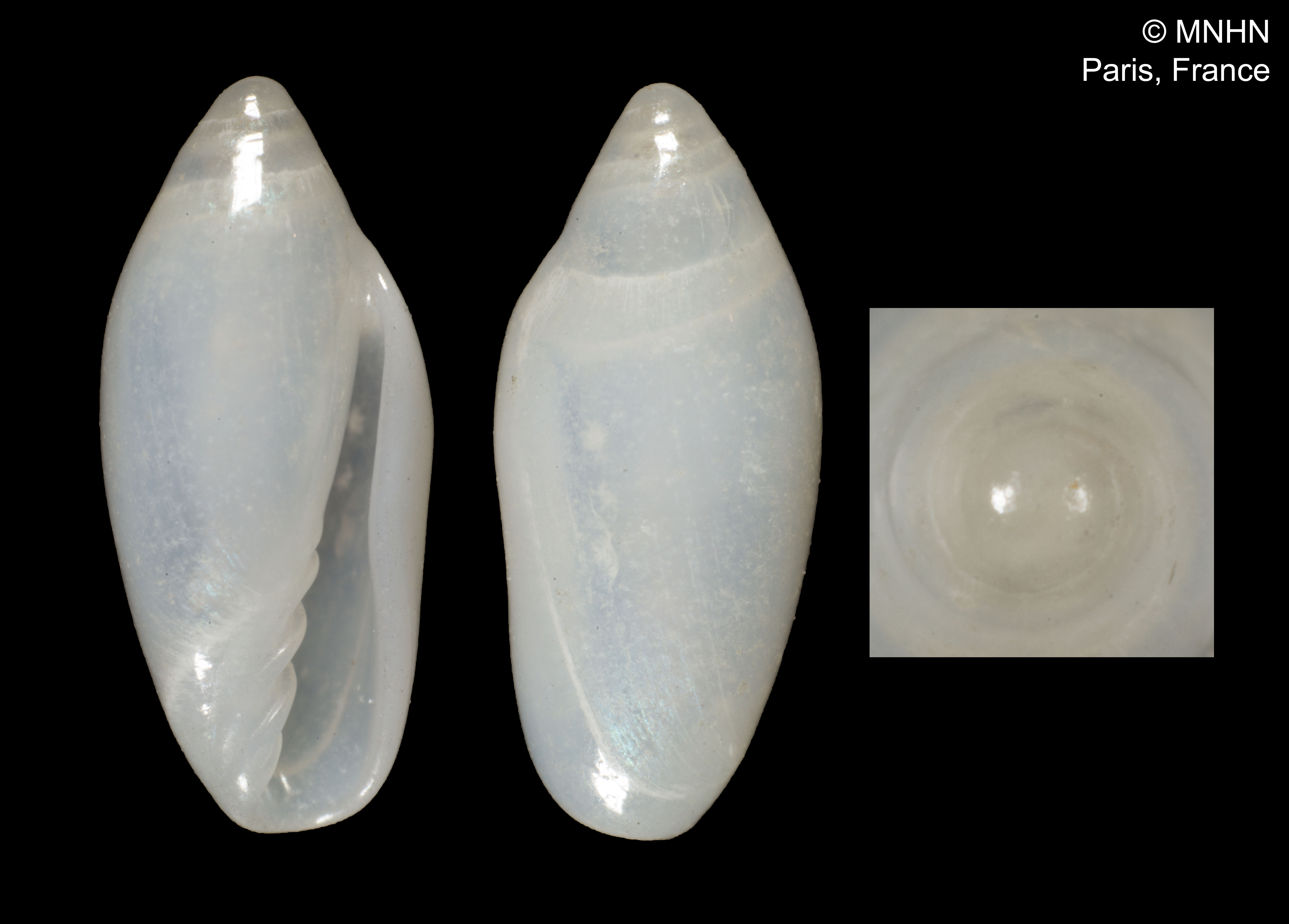
- Shell of Volvarina serrei (syntype at MNHN, Paris)

Scientific classification
- Kingdom: Animalia
- Phylum: Mollusca
- Class: Gastropoda
- Subclass: Caenogastropoda
- Order: Neogastropoda
- Family: Marginellidae
- Subfamily: Marginellinae
- Genus: Volvarina
- Species: V. serrei

Binomial name
- Volvarina serrei (Bavay, 1913)

Synonyms
- Marginella (Volvaria) serrei Bavay, 1913 (basionym); Marginella (Volvaria) serrei var. fulva Bavay, 1913; Prunum serrei (Bavay, 1913); Volvarina fulva (Bavay, 1913) ·

= Volvarina serrei =

Species of gastropod

Volvarina serrei is a species of sea snail, a marine gastropod mollusk in the family Marginellidae, the margin snails.

== Description ==
The length of the shell attains 6 mm, its diameter 2 mm.

(Original description in French) The shell is of mediocre size, elongated ovoid and a little attenuated towards the base. It is white and shiny. The shell contains four whorls, clearly conical, with a slightly obtuse apex. The aperture is slightly sinuous, narrowed upwards, widened towards the base. The outer lip is wide and thick in its upper and middle part, narrowed towards the base, slightly marginated on the outside and smooth inside. The columellar edge shows four subequal oblique plaits, the upper one a little weaker than the others.

== Distribution ==
This species occurs in the Atlantic Ocean off Bahia, Brazil.
