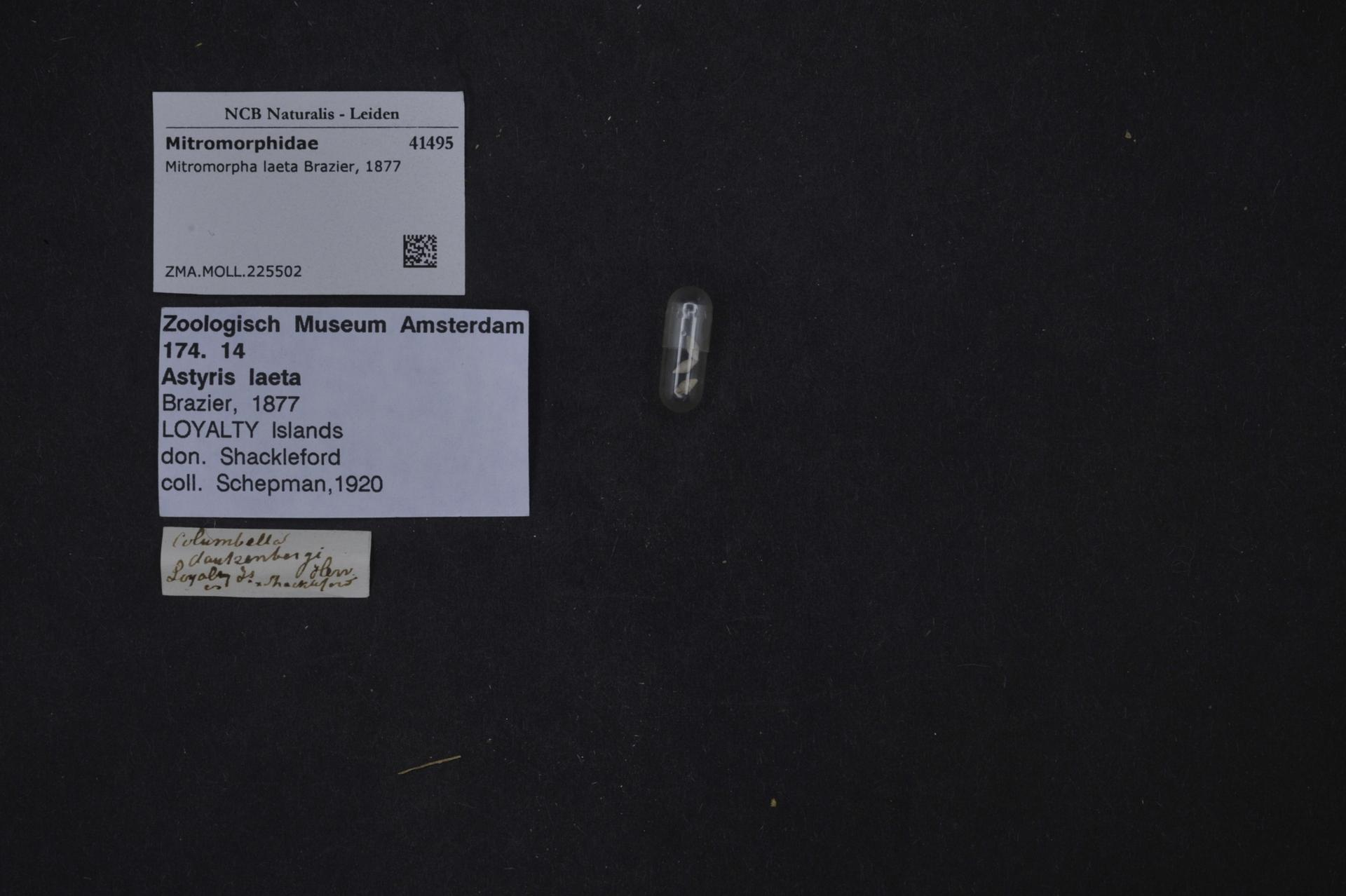

Scientific classification
- Kingdom: Animalia
- Phylum: Mollusca
- Class: Gastropoda
- Subclass: Caenogastropoda
- Order: Neogastropoda
- Family: Mitromorphidae
- Genus: Mitromorpha
- Species: M. laeta

Binomial name
- Mitromorpha laeta (Brazier, 1877)

Synonyms
- Columbella (Astyris) laeta Brazier, 1877

= Mitromorpha laeta =

Species of gastropod

Mitromorpha laeta is a species of sea snail, a marine gastropod mollusk in the family Mitromorphidae.

== Description ==
(Original description) The ovate shell is fulvous, smooth, and acuminated at both ends. It contains 6 whorls, spirally angled and slightly convex. They are transparent white at the angle, marbled above and below with dark fulvous lines, sometimes fiexuously waved. The spire is short. The white apex is rounded. The columella is smooth, curved, grooved in the middle, inner part forming a sharp lip below upper part, with thin deposit of callus, varicose below on the outside, peristome white, thin at edge, gibbous in the middle. The aperture is narrow, little more than half the whole length. The siphonal canal is narrow and slightly recurved.

== Distribution ==
This species is endemic to Australia and was found in the Torres Straits.
