= Volvarina pergrandis =

Scientific classification
- Kingdom: Animalia
- Phylum: Mollusca
- Class: Gastropoda
- Subclass: Caenogastropoda
- Order: Neogastropoda
- Family: Marginellidae
- Subfamily: Marginellinae
- Genus: Volvarina
- Species: V. pergrandis

Binomial name
- Volvarina pergrandis Clover, 1974

Synonyms
- Prunum pergrande (Clover, 1974); Prunum pergrandis [sic] (incorrect gender ending)

Species of gastropod

Volvarina pergrandis is a species of sea snail, a marine gastropod mollusk in the family Marginellidae, the margin snails.

== Distribution ==
This marine species occurs off Oman.
