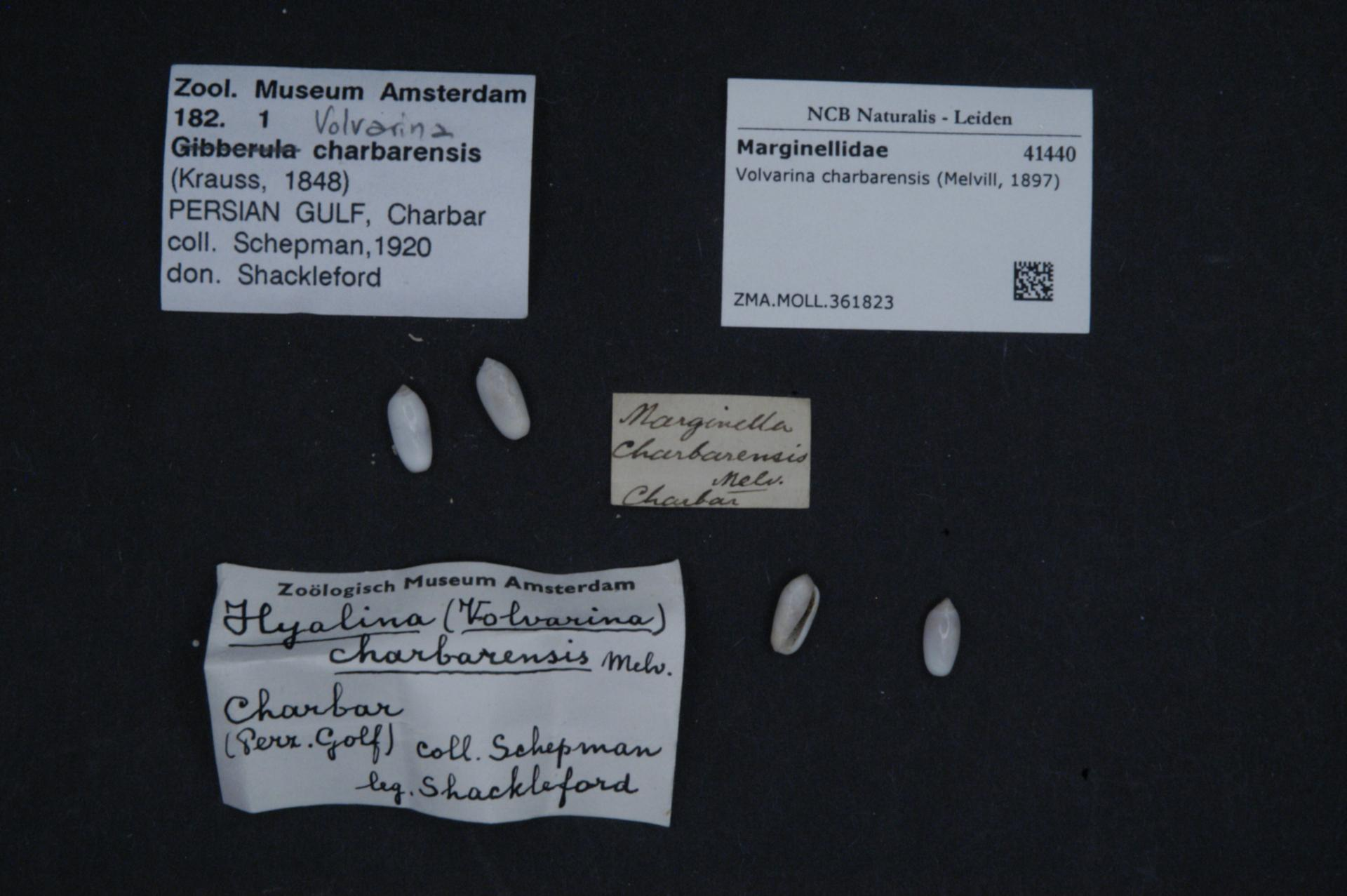
- Shell of Volvarina charbarensis (specimen at Naturalis Biodiversity Center)

Scientific classification
- Kingdom: Animalia
- Phylum: Mollusca
- Class: Gastropoda
- Subclass: Caenogastropoda
- Order: Neogastropoda
- Family: Marginellidae
- Subfamily: Marginellinae
- Genus: Volvarina
- Species: V. charbarensis

Binomial name
- Volvarina charbarensis (Melvill, 1897)

Synonyms
- Hyalina (Volvarina) charbarensis (Melvill, 1897); Marginella (Gibberula) charbarensis Melvill, 1897 (basionym); Prunum charbarensis (Melvill, 1897)

= Volvarina charbarensis =

Species of gastropod

Volvarina charbarensis is a species of sea snail, a marine gastropod mollusk in the family Marginellidae (the margin snails).

== Description ==
The length of the shell attains 8 mm, its diameter 4 mm.

According to the original description, it has a snowy-white, unicolorous, vividly polished shell with an acute apex. It contains five whorls. The body whorl is straight. The aperture is narrow and oblong. The outer lip is slightly thickened and involute. The columella has five plaits.

== Distribution ==
This marine species occurs in the Gulf of Oman.
