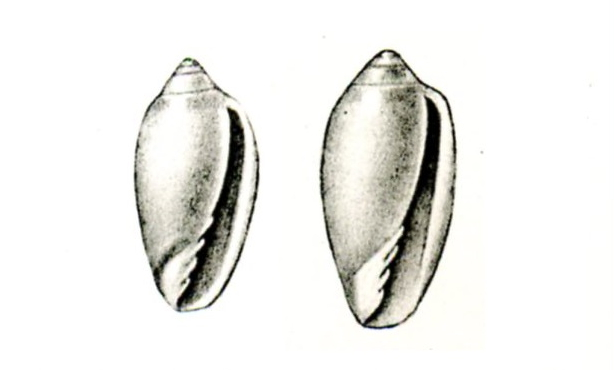
- Drawing of a shell of Volvarina laetitia

Scientific classification
- Kingdom: Animalia
- Phylum: Mollusca
- Class: Gastropoda
- Subclass: Caenogastropoda
- Order: Neogastropoda
- Family: Marginellidae
- Subfamily: Marginellinae
- Genus: Volvarina
- Species: V. laetitia

Binomial name
- Volvarina laetitia (Thiele, 1925)

Synonyms
- Marginella laetitia Thiele, 1925 (original combination); Prunum laetitium (Thiele, 1925) ·

= Volvarina laetitia =

Species of gastropod

Volvarina laetitia is a species of sea snail, a marine gastropod mollusk in the family Marginellidae, the margin snails.

== Description ==
The length of the shell attains 4.3 mm.

== Distribution ==
This marine species occurs off South Africa at the Agulhas Bank and off Durban Bay.
