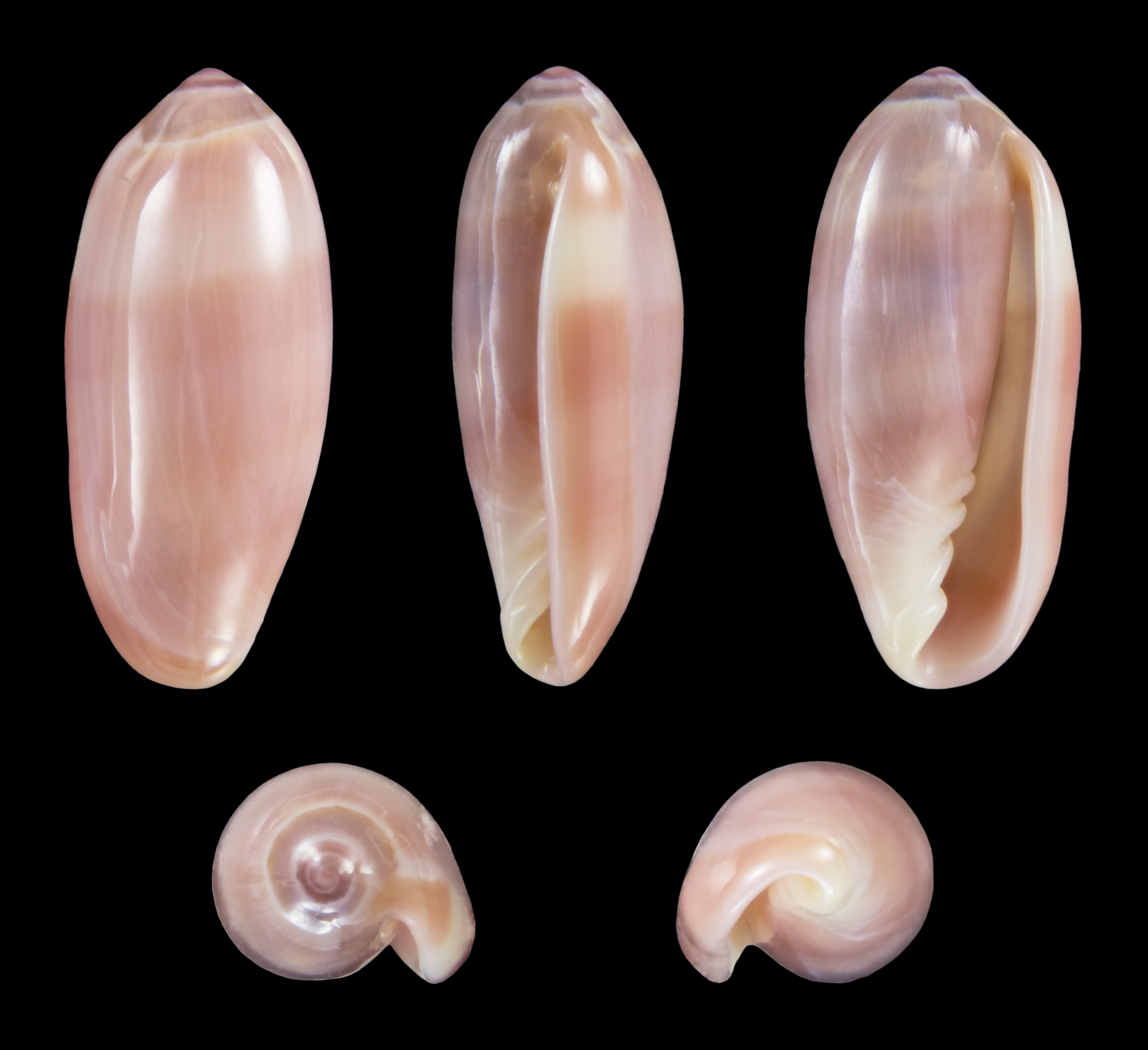

Scientific classification
- Kingdom: Animalia
- Phylum: Mollusca
- Class: Gastropoda
- Subclass: Caenogastropoda
- Order: Neogastropoda
- Family: Marginellidae
- Subfamily: Marginellinae
- Genus: Volvarina
- Species: V. taeniata

Binomial name
- Volvarina taeniata (G.B. Sowerby II, 1846)

Synonyms
- Marginella navicella Reeve, 1865; Marginella quadripunctata Locard, 1897; Marginella taeniata G. B. Sowerby II, 1846 (original combination); Volvarina (Atlantivolva) taeniata (G. B. Sowerby II, 1846) · alternate representation; Volvarina cessaci Jousseaume, 1881 · unaccepted; Volvarina cessaci Rochebrune, 1882 (junior homonym of Volvarina cessaci Jousseaume, 1881); Volvarina quadripunctata (Locard, 1897); Volvarina rubella navicella (Reeve, 1865) ·

= Volvarina taeniata =

Species of gastropod

Volvarina taeniata is a species of sea snail, a marine gastropod mollusk in the family Marginellidae, the margin snails.

== Description ==
The small, rather conical, smooth shell is pale-red and consists of five whorls. The spire is short. The aperture is elongate and rather narrow. The columella is four-plaited with the two plaits on top somewhat larger. The outer lip is smooth and somewhat reflexed.

== Distribution ==
This marine species occurs off the Cape Verde
