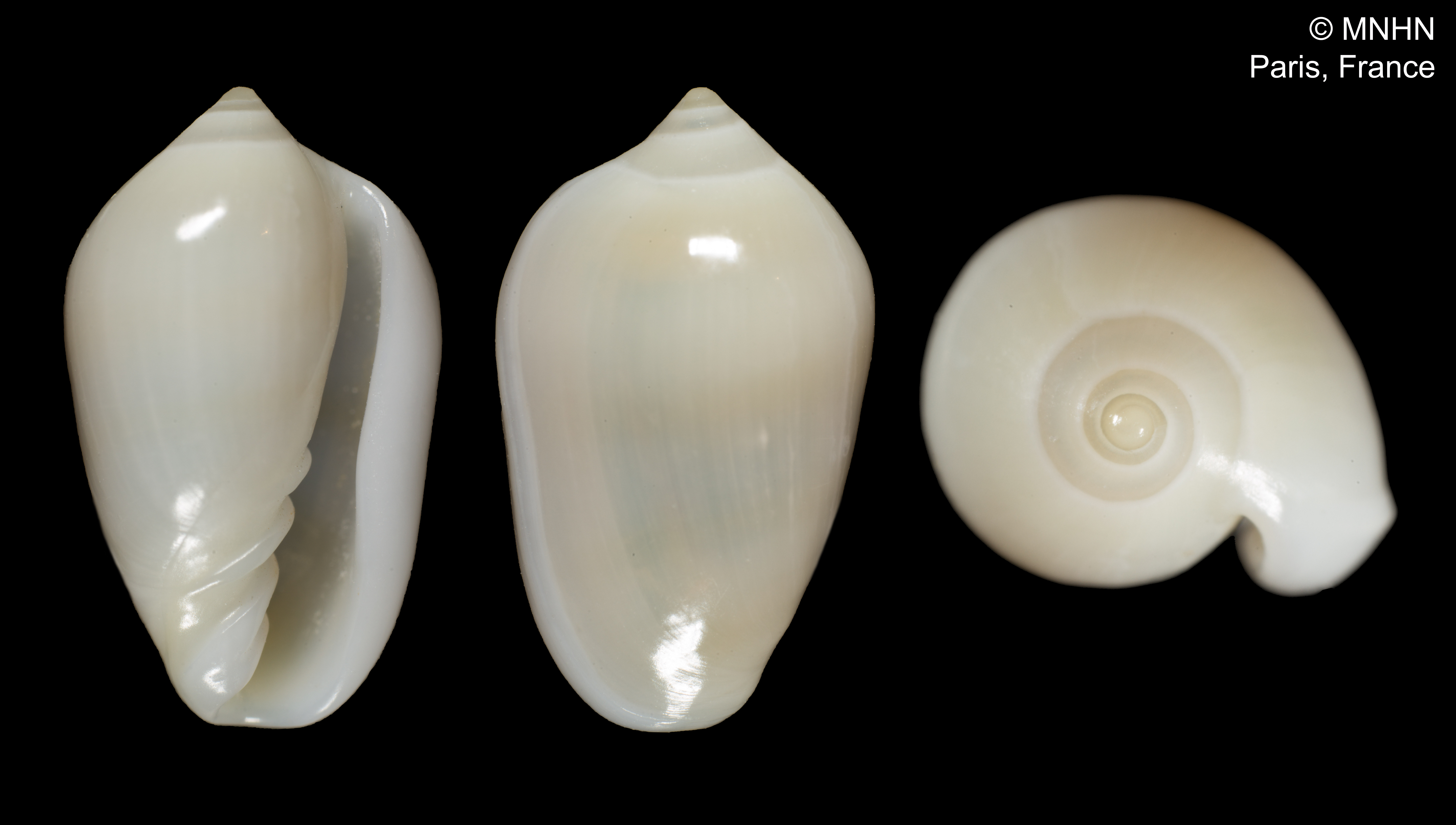
- Shell of Volvarina riparia (holotype at MNHN, Paris)

Scientific classification
- Kingdom: Animalia
- Phylum: Mollusca
- Class: Gastropoda
- Subclass: Caenogastropoda
- Order: Neogastropoda
- Family: Marginellidae
- Subfamily: Marginellinae
- Genus: Volvarina
- Species: V. riparia

Binomial name
- Volvarina riparia Gofas & F. Fernandes, 1992

Synonyms
- Prunum riparia (Gofas & F. Fernandes, 1992)

= Volvarina riparia =

Species of gastropod

Volvarina riparia is a species of sea snail, a marine gastropod mollusk in the family Marginellidae, the margin snails.

== Description ==
The length of the shell attains 9.1 mm.

== Distribution ==
This marine species occurs off Angola, Southern Atlantic Ocean.
