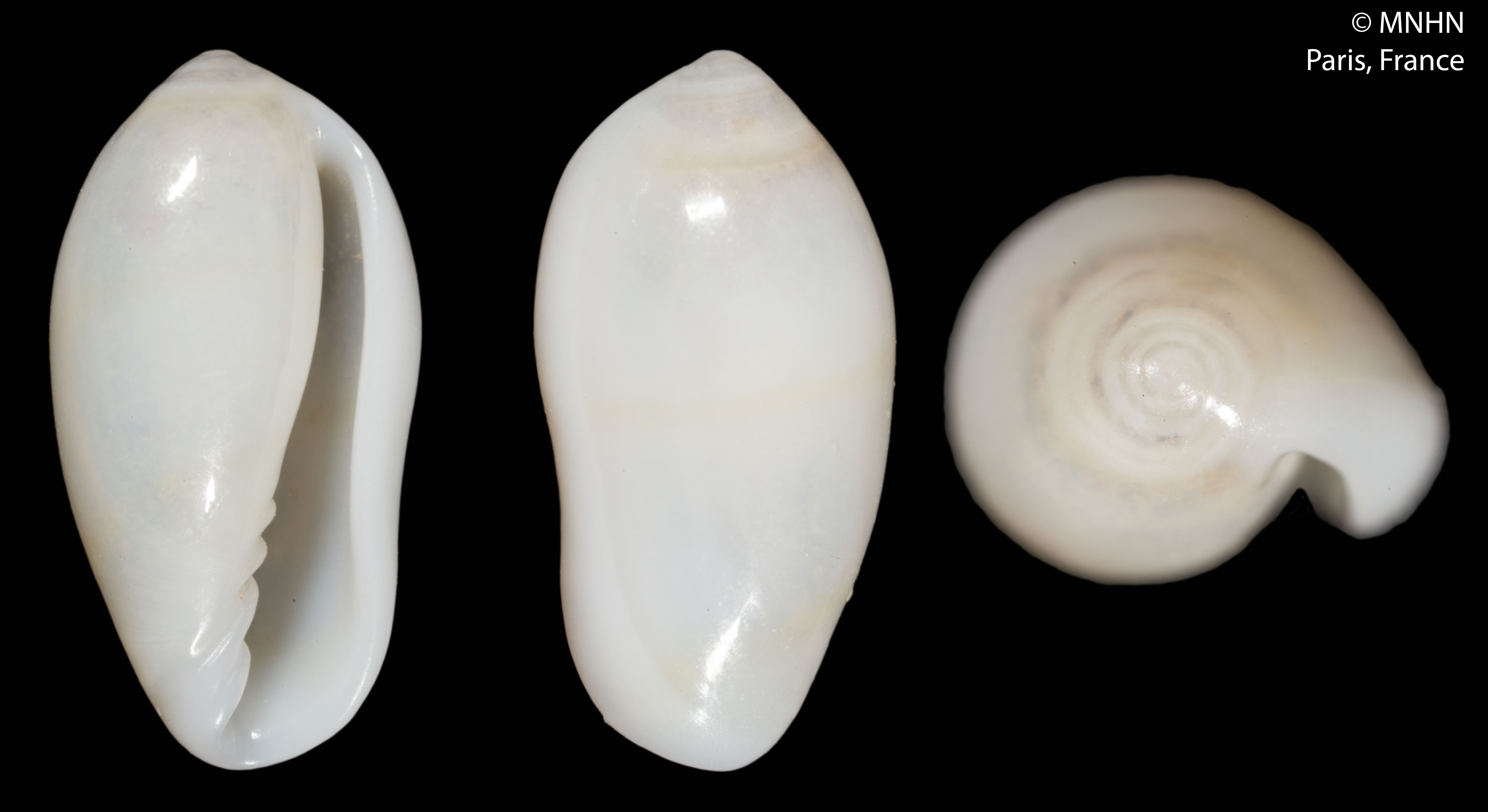
- Shell of Volvarina sauliae (syntype at MNHN, Paris)

Scientific classification
- Kingdom: Animalia
- Phylum: Mollusca
- Class: Gastropoda
- Subclass: Caenogastropoda
- Order: Neogastropoda
- Family: Marginellidae
- Subfamily: Marginellinae
- Genus: Volvarina
- Species: V. sauliae

Binomial name
- Volvarina sauliae (G.B. Sowerby II, 1846)

Synonyms
- Gibberula jousseaumi Rochebrune, 1881; Gibberula rachmaninovi Kellner, 2003; Marginella jousseaumi (Rochebrune, 1882); Marginella sauliae G.B. Sowerby II, 1846 (basionym); Prunum sauliae (G.B. Sowerby II, 1846)

= Volvarina sauliae =

Species of gastropod

Volvarina sauliae is a species of sea snail, a marine gastropod mollusk in the family Marginellidae, the margin snails.

== Description ==
The length of the shell attains 7.3 mm.

The small, rather conical, smooth shell shows two reddish lines across the body whorl. The spire is very short, the aperture is long. The columella is four-plaited, the last plait subincrassate. The outer lip is smooth, scarcely raised from the body whorl at its reflected margin.

== Distribution ==
This species occurs in the Atlantic Ocean off Cape Verde and Mauritius
