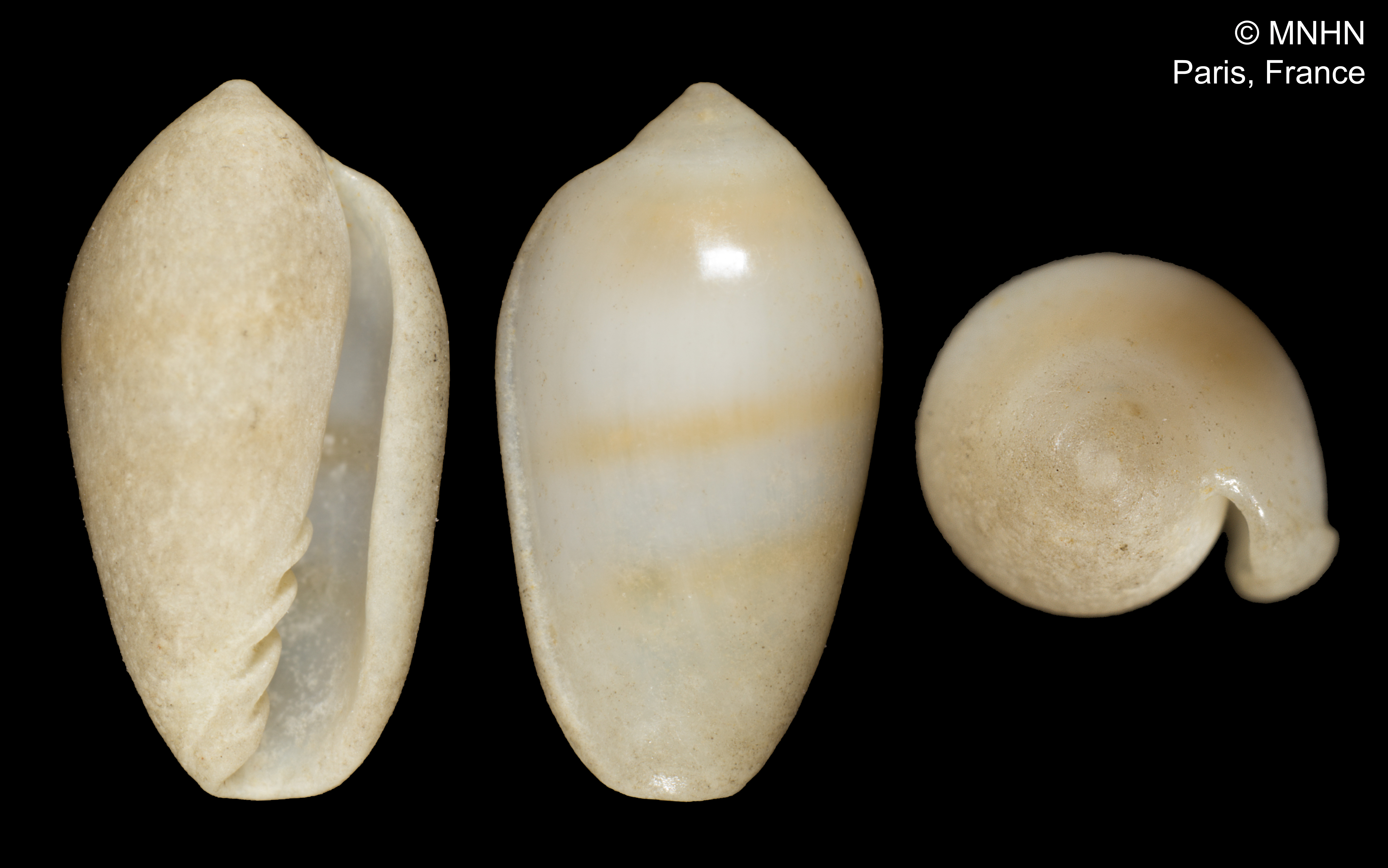
- Shell of Volvarina ameliensis (lectotype at MNHN, Paris)

Scientific classification
- Kingdom: Animalia
- Phylum: Mollusca
- Class: Gastropoda
- Subclass: Caenogastropoda
- Order: Neogastropoda
- Family: Marginellidae
- Subfamily: Marginellinae
- Genus: Volvarina
- Species: V. ameliensis

Binomial name
- Volvarina ameliensis (Tomlin, 1917)

Synonyms
- Marginella ameliensis Tomlin, 1917 (original combination); Marginella bivittata Bavay, 1912; Prunum ameliensis) (Tomlin, 1917 ·

= Volvarina ameliensis =

Species of gastropod

Volvarina ameliensis is a species of sea snail, a marine gastropod mollusk in the family Marginellidae, the margin snails.

== Description ==
The length of the shell attains 8 mm, its diameter 4 mm.

(Described as Marginella bivittata) The shell has a medium size, oval-elongated, narrow and rounded at the top, attenuated towards the base. The spire is short, conical, rounded and has an obtuse protoconch. It is composed of 4 whorls, separated by a barely visible suture under a layer of enamel covering it. The aperture is slightly oblique and slightly dilated towards the base, occupying four-fifths of the height of the shell. The columella has 4 rather strong oblique subequal plaits. The outer lip is thickened, marginated and widened in the middle.

The shell is yellowish gray. The body whorl shows two narrow orange bands, located one a little above the middle, the other below the middle. A zone of the same shade, wider, but not limited at the bottom, is prominent immediately below the suture.

== Distribution ==
This marine species occurs in the Atlantic Ocean off Angola.
