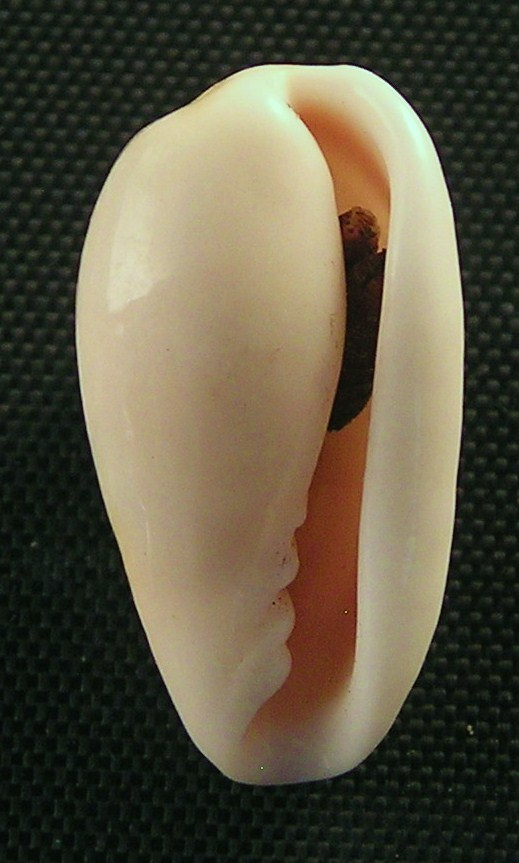
- Shell of Volvarina mabellae

Scientific classification
- Kingdom: Animalia
- Phylum: Mollusca
- Class: Gastropoda
- Subclass: Caenogastropoda
- Order: Neogastropoda
- Family: Marginellidae
- Subfamily: Marginellinae
- Genus: Volvarina
- Species: V. mabellae

Binomial name
- Volvarina mabellae (Melvill & Standen, 1901)

Synonyms
- Bullata mabellae (Melvill & Standen, 1901); Cryptospira mabellae (Melvill & Standen, 1901); Marginella (Cryptospira) mabellae Melvill & Standen, 1901 superseded combination; Prunum mabellae (Melvill & Standen, 1901)

= Volvarina mabellae =

Species of gastropod

Volvarina mabellae is a species of sea snail, a marine gastropod mollusk in the family Marginellidae, the margin snails.

== Description ==
The length of the shell attains 22 mm.

(Original description) The solid shell is gracefully oblong and very shining. The shell contains four whorls, the upper ones almost hidden by callosities. The body whorl is darkest and is spirally wrapped. The outer lip is almost straight, high, very shiny, and has a thick ochreous callus dorsally marginated. The oblong aperture is narrow. The columella is four times plaited. The shell is straw-coloured, with a white shining callous deposit over the columellar region and outer lip.

== Distribution ==
This marine species occurs in the Arabian Sea off Western India.
