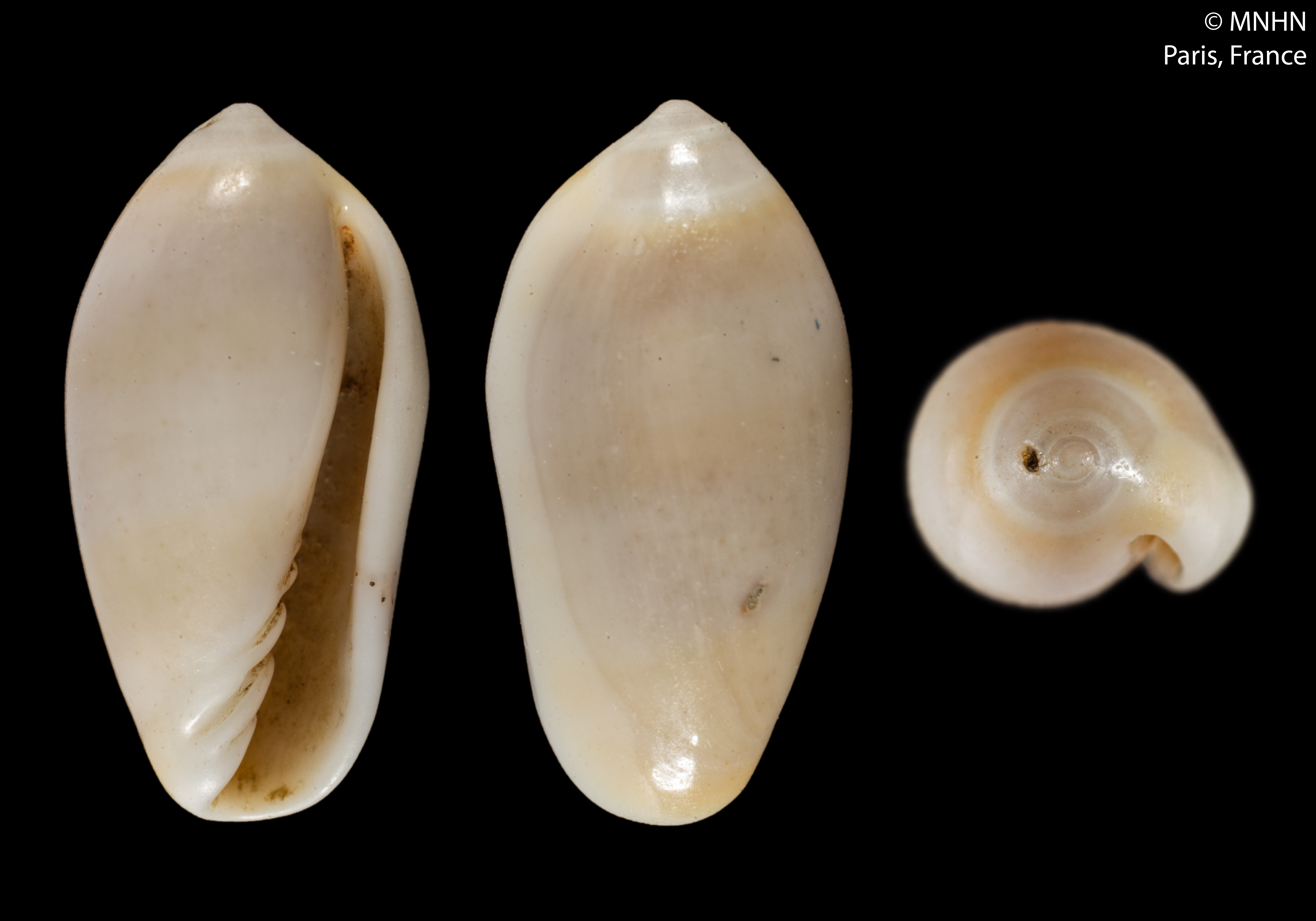
- Shell of Volvarina exilis (specimen at MNHN, Paris)

Scientific classification
- Kingdom: Animalia
- Phylum: Mollusca
- Class: Gastropoda
- Subclass: Caenogastropoda
- Order: Neogastropoda
- Family: Marginellidae
- Genus: Volvarina
- Species: V. exilis

Binomial name
- Volvarina exilis (Gmelin, 1791)

Synonyms
- Marginella exilis (Gmelin, 1791); Marginella fusca G. B. Sowerby II, 1846; Marginella rufescens Reeve, 1865; Marginella tribalteata Reeve, 1865; Marginella triticea Lamarck, 1822; Prunum exile (Gmelin, 1791); Voluta biannullata O. Fabricius, 1826 junior subjective synonym; Voluta exilis Gmelin, 1791 (basionym); Volvarina fusca G.B. Sowerby II, 1846; Volvarina rufescens Reeve, 1865; Volvarina simeri Jousseaume, 1875; Volvarina tribalteata Reeve, 1865

= Volvarina exilis =

Species of gastropod

Volvarina exilis, common name the three-belted marginella, is a species of sea snail, a marine gastropod mollusk in the family Marginellidae, the margin snails.

== Description ==
The length of the shell attains 9 mm.

The shell is conically cylindrical, opaque-white and shining. It is encircled with three orange-brown bands. The spire is small. The whorls are rather swollen at the upper part and attenuated at the lower. The outer lip is moderately flexuous. The columella is four-plaited.

== Distribution ==
This marine species occurs off Morocco.
