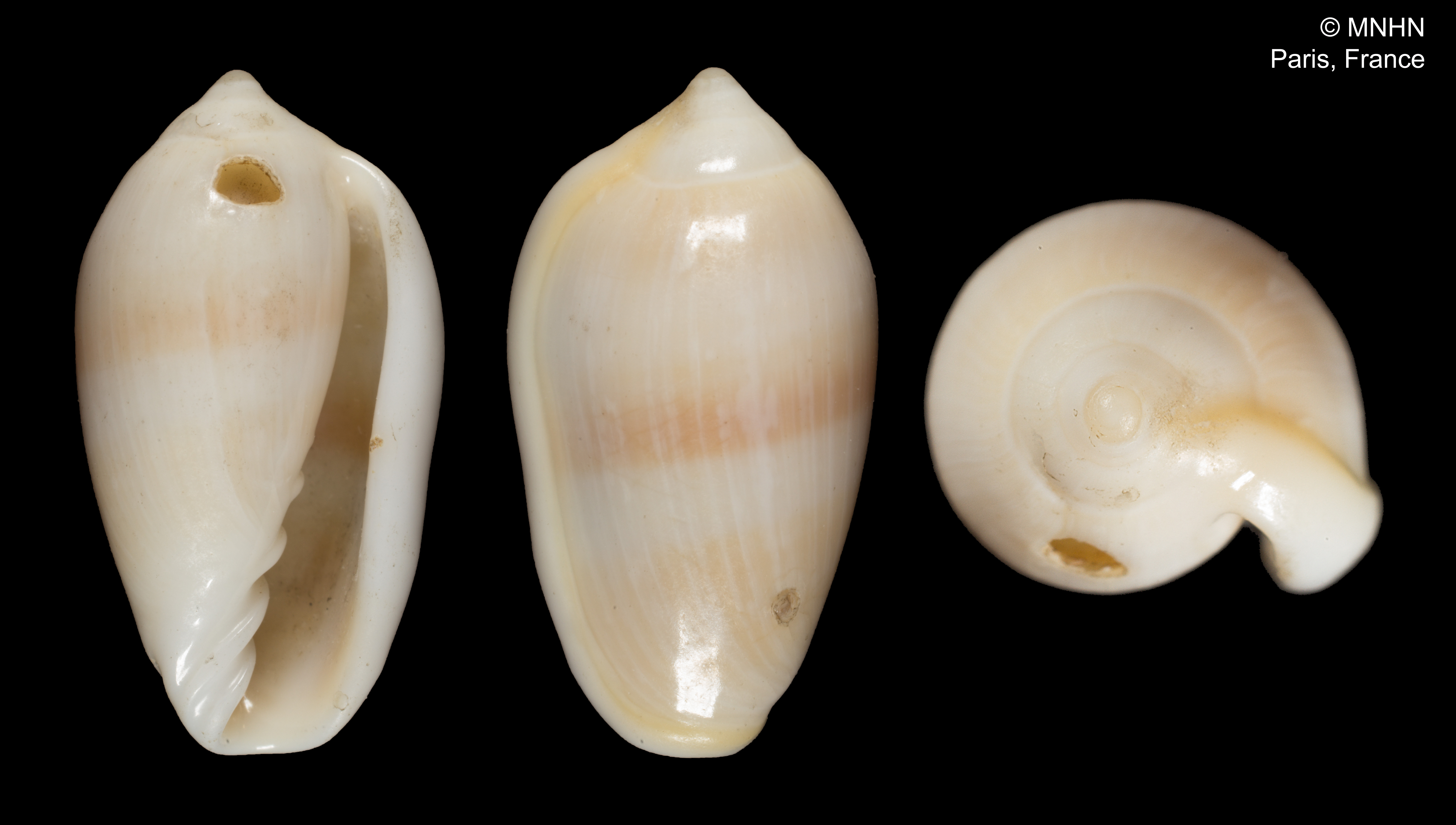
- Shell of Prunum olivaeforme (syntype at MNHN, Paris)

Scientific classification
- Kingdom: Animalia
- Phylum: Mollusca
- Class: Gastropoda
- Subclass: Caenogastropoda
- Order: Neogastropoda
- Family: Marginellidae
- Genus: Prunum
- Species: P. olivaeforme

Binomial name
- Prunum olivaeforme (Kiener, 1834)

Synonyms
- Bullata hindsiana (Petit de la Saussaye, 1851); Egouena laeta Jousseaume, 1875; Marginella constricta Hinds, 1844; Marginella hindsiana Petit de la Saussaye, 1851; Marginella laeta Jousseaume, 1875; Marginella olivaeformis Kiener, 1834 (basionym); Prunum olivaeformis (Kiener, 1834); Volvarina olivaeformis (Kiener, 1834)

= Prunum olivaeforme =

Species of gastropod

Prunum olivaeforme is a species of sea snail, a marine gastropod mollusk in the family Marginellidae, the margin snails.

== Description ==
The length of the shell attains 12 mm.

== Distribution ==
This marine species occurs off Senegal.
