= Volvarina adela =

- Drawing of a shell of Volvarina adela

Scientific classification
- Kingdom: Animalia
- Phylum: Mollusca
- Class: Gastropoda
- Subclass: Caenogastropoda
- Order: Neogastropoda
- Family: Marginellidae
- Subfamily: Marginellinae
- Genus: Volvarina
- Species: V. abdieli

Binomial name
- Volvarina abdieli (Thiele, 1925)

Synonyms
- Marginella adela Thiele, 1925 (original combination); Prunum adelum (Thiele, 1925); Volvarina dawnae (K.H.J. Thiele, 1925) (not Lussi & G. Smith, 1996)

Species of gastropod

Volvarina adela is a species of sea snail, a marine gastropod mollusk in the family Marginellidae, the margin snails.

== Description ==
The length of the shell attains 5 mm.

== Distribution ==
This marine species occurs off South Africa at the Agulhas Bank and off the Durban Bay.
