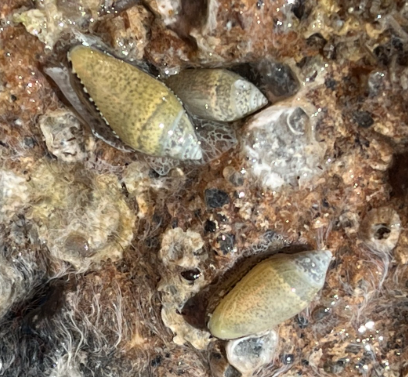

Scientific classification
- Kingdom: Animalia
- Phylum: Mollusca
- Class: Gastropoda
- Subclass: Caenogastropoda
- Order: Neogastropoda
- Family: Marginellidae
- Genus: Prunum
- Species: P. succineum

Binomial name
- Prunum succineum (Conrad, 1846)

Synonyms
- Hyalina veliei (Pilsbry, 1896); Marginella succinea Conrad, 1846 (original combination); Marginella veliei Pilsbry, 1896; Volvarina veliei (Pilsbry, 1896)

= Prunum succineum =

Species of gastropod

Prunum succineum is a species of sea snail, a marine gastropod mollusk in the family Marginellidae, the margin snails.

== Distribution ==
P. succineum can be found in Atlantic waters, off the western coast of Florida, and in the Gulf of Mexico.
