= Volvarina dinisioi =

Scientific classification
- Kingdom: Animalia
- Phylum: Mollusca
- Class: Gastropoda
- Subclass: Caenogastropoda
- Order: Neogastropoda
- Family: Marginellidae
- Subfamily: Marginellinae
- Genus: Volvarina
- Species: V. dinisioi

Binomial name
- Volvarina dinisioi (T. Cossignani, 2006)

Synonyms
- Prunum dinisioi T. Cossignani, 2006 (original combination)

Species of gastropod

Volvarina dinisioi is a species of sea snail, a marine gastropod mollusk in the family Marginellidae, the margin snails.

== Description ==
The length of the shell attains 19.1 mm.

== Distribution ==
This marine species occurs off Somalia, Indian Ocean.
