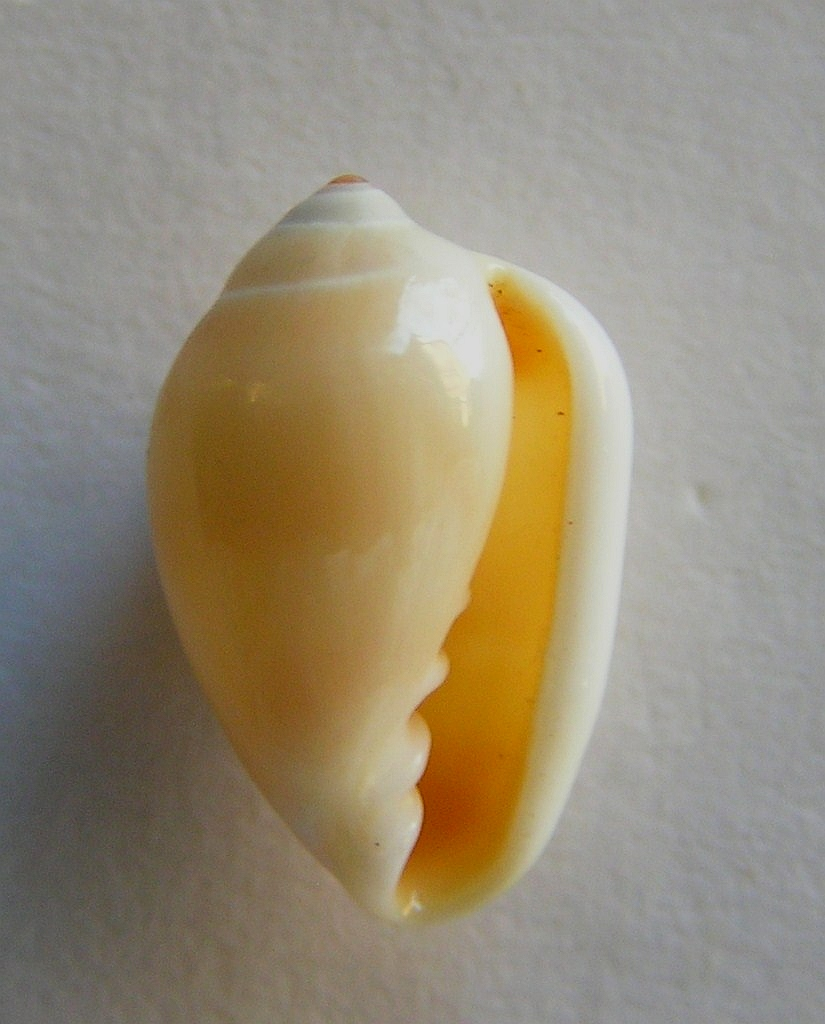
- Apertural view of Volvarina monilis

Scientific classification
- Kingdom: Animalia
- Phylum: Mollusca
- Class: Gastropoda
- Subclass: Caenogastropoda
- Order: Neogastropoda
- Family: Marginellidae
- Genus: Volvarina
- Species: V. monilis

Binomial name
- Volvarina monilis (Linnaeus, 1758)

Synonyms
- Egouena gibbosa Jousseaume, 1875; Marginella gibbosa (Jousseaume, 1875); Marginella monilis (Linnaeus, 1758); Marginella terveriana Petit de la Saussaye, 1851; Prunum monile (Linnaeus, 1758); Prunum terverianum (Petit de la Saussaye, 1851); Voluta monilis Linnaeus, 1758 (original combination)

= Volvarina monilis =

Species of gastropod

Volvarina monilis is a species of sea snail, a marine gastropod mollusk in the family Marginellidae, the margin snails.

== Description ==
The length of the shell attains 11 mm.

The shell is ivory-white. The columella is four-plaited; above the plaits are additional denticulations.

The African tribes form necklaces of these shells. For the purpose of stringing them a hole is made through the upper part of the body-whorl, apparently by rubbing.

== Distribution ==
This marine species occurs off Senegal and Guinea; also in the Red Sea.
