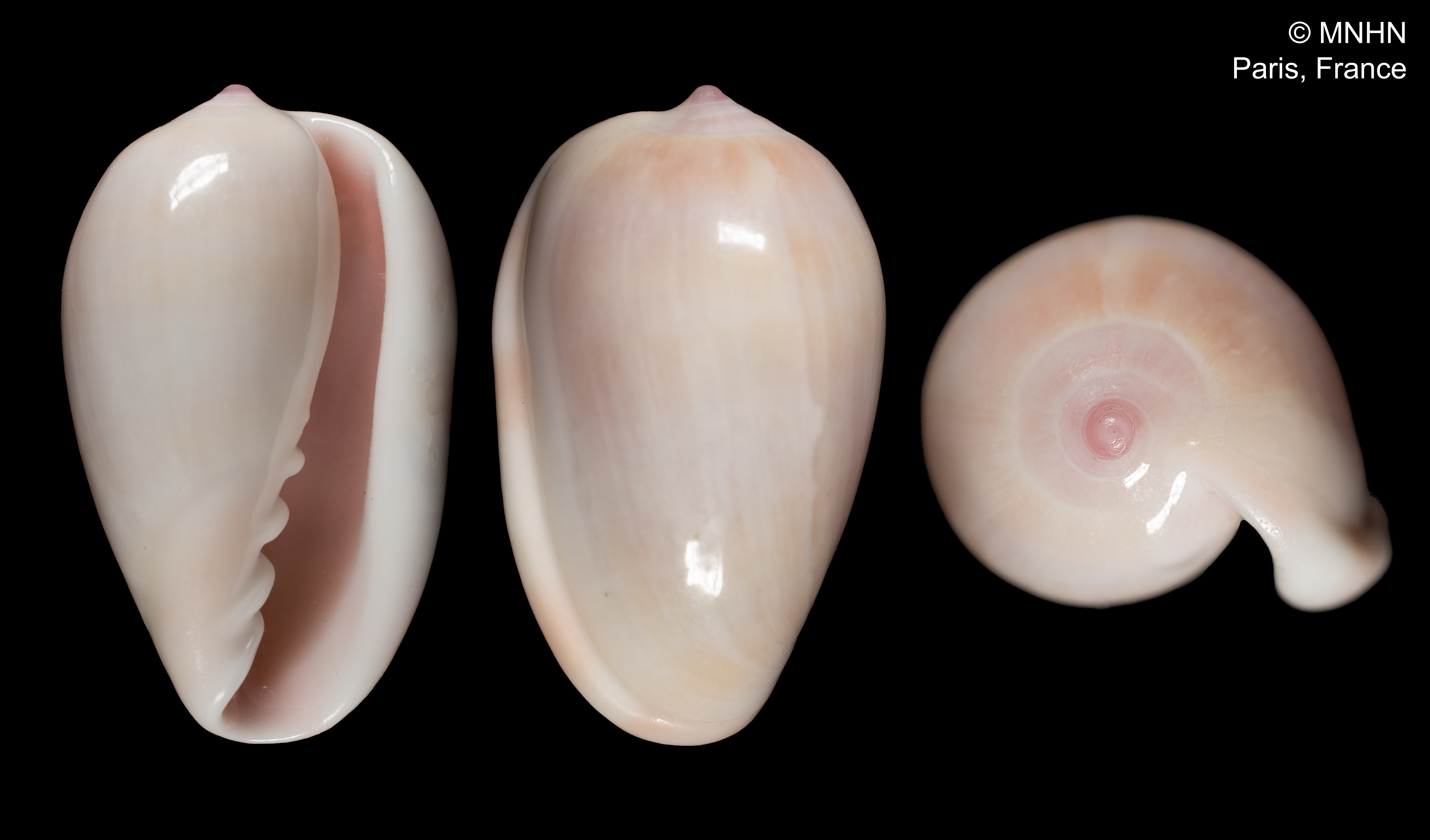
- Shell of Volvarina fortunata (holotype at MNHN, Paris)

Scientific classification
- Kingdom: Animalia
- Phylum: Mollusca
- Class: Gastropoda
- Subclass: Caenogastropoda
- Order: Neogastropoda
- Family: Marginellidae
- Subfamily: Marginellinae
- Genus: Volvarina
- Species: V. fortunata

Binomial name
- Volvarina fortunata Clover & Macca, 1990

Synonyms
- Prunum fortunatum (Clover & Macca, 1990)

= Volvarina fortunata =

Species of gastropod

Volvarina fortunata is a species of sea snail, a marine gastropod mollusk in the family Marginellidae, the margin snails.

== Description ==
The length of the shell attains 26.0 mm, its diameter 15.8 mm.

== Distribution ==
This marine species occurs off Somalia, in the Indian Ocean.
