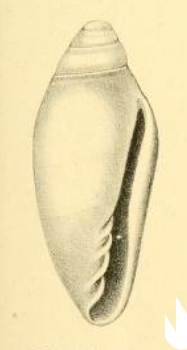
- Shell of Volvarina roberti (holotype)

Scientific classification
- Kingdom: Animalia
- Phylum: Mollusca
- Class: Gastropoda
- Subclass: Caenogastropoda
- Order: Neogastropoda
- Family: Marginellidae
- Subfamily: Marginellinae
- Genus: Volvarina
- Species: V. roberti

Binomial name
- Volvarina roberti (Bavay, 1917)

Synonyms
- Marginella roberti Bavay, 1917 (original combination); Prunum roberti (Bavay, 1917)

= Volvarina roberti =

Species of gastropod

Volvarina roberti is a species of sea snail, a marine gastropod mollusk in the family Marginellidae, the margin snails.

== Description ==
The length of the shell attains 9.6 mm.

(Original description in French) The elongated shell is biconical, remarkable for the convexity of the upper whorls. This striking convexity shows especially on the visible part of the penultimate whorl. The shell consists of 4½ to 5 whorls, the first one obtuse. They are separated by a fairly smooth and very narrowly margined suture. The body whorl is convex, especially in its upper part, but obtuse at its lower part. It forms 3/4 of the total height of the shell. The aperture is elongated, slightly oblique and dilated in its lower half only. The smooth outer lip is almost straight. The inner lip contains at the base four very prominent, inclined plaits, of which the three lower ones are substantially equal to each other, the fourth is a little more stocky. The shell has a very light fawn color with three bands a little darker on the body whorl. The outer lip and the columellar plaits are whitish.

== Distribution ==
This marin especies occurs in the Atlantic Ocean off Madeira and the Canary Islands; also off Brazil.
