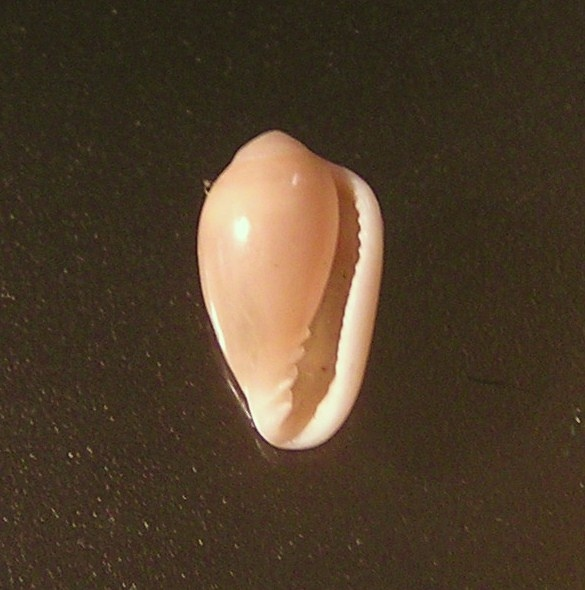
- Hyalina keenii

Scientific classification
- Kingdom: Animalia
- Phylum: Mollusca
- Class: Gastropoda
- Subclass: Caenogastropoda
- Order: Neogastropoda
- Superfamily: Volutoidea
- Family: Marginellidae
- Genus: Hyalina; Schumacher, 1817

Type species
- Hyalina pellucida Schumacher, 1817

Synonyms
- Caribeginella Espinosa & Ortea, 1998; Marginellona (Volvarina) Fischer, 1883

= Hyalina =

Genus of gastropods

Hyalina is a genus of sea snails, marine gastropod mollusks in the subfamily Pruninae of the family Marginellidae, the margin snails.

Hyalinia Charpentier, 1837 is a junior synonym of Oxychilus Fitzinger, 1833 (family Oxychilidae).

== Species ==
Species within the genus Hyalina include:

- Hyalina albocylindrus Lussi & Smith, 1999
- Hyalina angelquirosi Espinosa & Ortea, 2015
- Hyalina aurorae Espinosa & Ortea, 2015
- Hyalina biancaliviae T. Cossignani & Lorenz, 2020
- Hyalina bonjour Ortea & Espinosa, 2017
- Hyalina brocktoni (Shackleford, 1914)
- Hyalina buskei Espinosa & Ortea, 2013
- Hyalina caribaea Espinosa, Ortea & Diez, 2018
- Hyalina chicoi Espinosa & Ortea, 1999
- Hyalina cotamago Yokoyama, 1922
- Hyalina cubensis Espinosa & Ortea, 1999
- Hyalina cylindrica (G.B. Sowerby II, 1846)
- Hyalina dearmasi Espinosa & Ortea, 2003
- Hyalina discors Roth, 1974
- Hyalina egregia Espinosa, Ortea & Diez, 2017
- Hyalina electrina (G.B. Sowerby III, 1892)
- Hyalina equina Espinosa & Ortea, 2018
- Hyalina fortsaintlouis Ortea & Espinosa, 2017
- Hyalina gibberuliformis Bozzetti, 1997
- Hyalina helena (Thiele, 1925)
- Hyalina jamaiquina Espinosa & Ortea, 2018
- Hyalina keenii (Marrat, 1871)
- Hyalina lucida (Marrat, 1877)
- Hyalina nelsyae Caballer, Espinosa, Ortea & Narciso, 2013
- Hyalina oscaritoi Espinosa, Moro & Ortea, 2011
- Hyalina pallida (Linnaeus, 1758)
- Hyalina perla (Marrat, 1876)
- Hyalina perovula Yokoyama, 1922
- Hyalina redferni Espinosa & Ortea, 2002 - temporary name, Unavailable: type specimens not fixed
- Hyalina sagamiensis Kuroda, Habe & Oyama, 1971
- Hyalina saintjames Ortea & Espinosa, 2016
- Hyalina sowerbyi Turton, 1932
- Hyalina surcaribe Espinosa, Moro & Ortea, 2011
- Hyalina triplicata Boyer, 2017
- Hyalina valentinae T. Cossignani, 2019
- Hyalina vallei Espinosa & Ortea, 2002

Species brought into synonymy

- Hyalina (Volvarina): synonym of Volvarina Hinds, 1844
- Hyalina (Volvarina) mustelina Angas, 1871: synonym of Serrata mustelina (Angas, 1871)
- Hyalina albolineata (d'Orbigny, 1842): synonym of Volvarina albolineata (d'Orbigny, 1842)
- Hyalina avena (Kiener, 1834): synonym of Volvarina avena (Kiener, 1834)
- Hyalina avenacea: synonym of Volvarina avena (Kiener, 1834) (incorrect subsequent spelling of Marginella avena Kiener, 1834)
- Hyalina bojanae A. J. Wagner, 1907: synonym of Morlina glabra nitidissima (Mousson, 1859) (junior synonym)
- Hyalina borroi Espinosa & Ortea, 1998: synonym of Volvarina borroi (Espinosa & Ortea, 1998)
- Hyalina cineracea Dall, 1889: synonym of Prunum cineraceum (Dall, 1889)
- Hyalina dautzenbergi A. J. Wagner, 1907: synonym of Mediterranea planorbis (Möllendorff, 1899) (junior synonym)
- Hyalina deliciosa (Bavay in Dautzenberg, 1912): synonym of Volvarina deliciosa (Bavay in Dautzenberg, 1912)
- Hyalina depressa Sterki, 1880: synonym of Mediterranea depressa (Sterki, 1880) (original combination)
- Hyalina ealesae (Powell, 1958): synonym of Volvarina ealesae (Powell, 1958)
- Hyalina elusiva Dall, 1927: synonym of Prunum torticulum (Dall, 1881)
- Hyalina gracilis C.B. Adams, 1851: synonym of Volvarina gracilis (C.B. Adams, 1851)
- Hyalina heterozona (Jousseaume, 1875): synonym of Volvarina heterozona Jousseaume, 1875
- Hyalina hyalina (Thiele, 1913): synonym of Volvarina hyalina (Thiele, 1912)
- Hyalina lactea (Kiener, 1841): synonym of Volvarina abbreviata (C. B. Adams, 1850)
- Hyalina lentiformis Kobelt, 1882: synonym of Oxychilus lentiformis (Kobelt, 1882) (original combination)
- Hyalina malinowskii L. Pfeiffer, 1865: synonym of Oxychilus deilus (Bourguignat, 1857) (junior synonym)
- Hyalina moolenbeeki Espinosa & Ortea, 2012: synonym of Hyalina pallida (Linnaeus, 1758)
- Hyalina myrmecoon Dall, 1919: synonym of Plesiocystiscus myrmecoon (Dall, 1919) (original combination)
- Hyalina nitens (Michaud, 1831): synonym of Aegopinella nitens (Michaud, 1831)
- Hyalina osoriensis Wollaston, 1878: synonym of Retinella (Lyrodiscus) osoriensis (Wollaston, 1878) represented as Retinella osoriensis (Wollaston, 1878) (original combination)
- Hyalina parvula Locard, 1898: synonym of Volvarina attenuata (Reeve, 1865)
- Hyalina pellucida Schumacher, 1817: synonym of Hyalina pallida (Linnaeus, 1758)
- Hyalina planospira A. J. Wagner, 1907: synonym of Mediterranea planospiroides (A. Riedel, 1969) (homonym; non Hyalina (Euhyalina) planospira Sacco, 1886)
- Hyalina puella Gould, 1861: synonym of Prunum capensis (Krauss, 1848): synonym of Volvarina capensis (Krauss, 1848)
- Hyalina secalina (Philippi, 1844): synonym of Volvarina mitrella (Risso, 1826)
- Hyalina styria: synonym of Volvarina styria (Dall, 1889)
- Hyalina subtriplicata (d'Orbigny, 1842): synonym of Volvarina subtriplicata (d'Orbigny, 1842)
- Hyalina tenuilabra (Tomlin, 1917): synonym of Hyalina pallida (Linnaeus, 1758)
- Hyalina torticulum (Dall, 1881): synonym of Prunum torticulum (Dall, 1881)
- Hyalina veliei (Pilsbry, 1896): synonym of Prunum succinea (Conrad, 1846)
- Hyalina warrenii (Marrat, 1876): synonym of Volvarina warrenii (Marrat, 1876)
