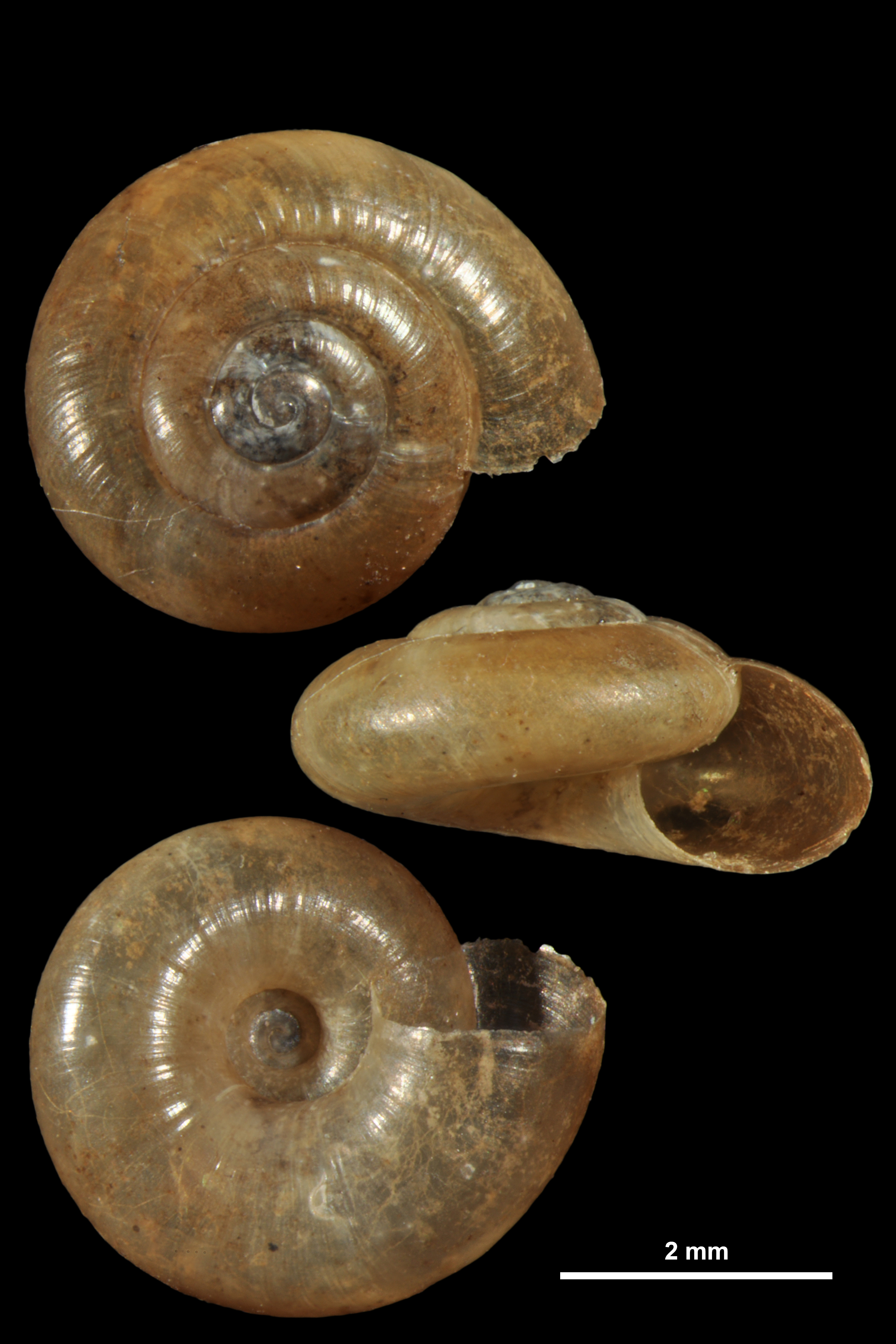
- Shell of Aegopinella pura (specimen at MNHN, Paris)

Scientific classification
- Kingdom: Animalia
- Phylum: Mollusca
- Class: Gastropoda
- Order: Stylommatophora
- Family: Gastrodontidae
- Genus: Aegopinella
- Species: A. pura

Binomial name
- Aegopinella pura (Alder, 1830)
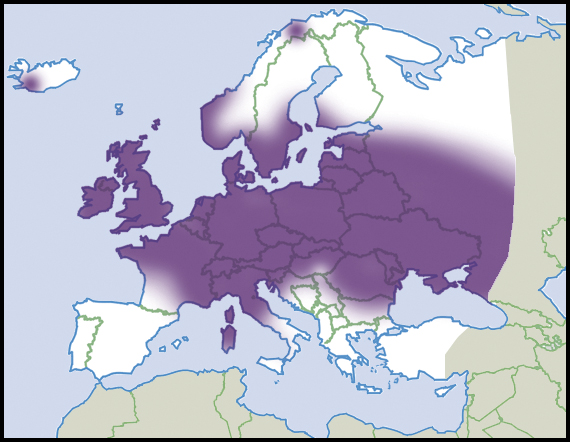

Synonyms
- Helix pura Alder, 1830 (new combination)

= Aegopinella pura =

Species of gastropod

Aegopinella pura, common name the clear glass snail, is a species of small land snail, a terrestrial pulmonate gastropod mollusk in the family Gastrodontidae, the glass snails.

== Description ==
For terms see gastropod shell

The diameter of the shell attains 5 mm (0.2 in), its height 2.7 mm (0.11 in).

The shell is colorless or light brown with a faint shine. Its microsculpture, visible only under a microscope at 35-40x magnification, consists of faint spiral lines intersecting with irregular radial lines. The shell has 3.5 to 4 convex whorls, with the body whorl increasing in size but not descending near the aperture. The umbilicus is wide and slightly eccentric.

(Original description) The shell is depressed, rather shiny, transparent, and white, slightly striated or wrinkled. It has four relatively flat whorls arranged diagonally. The underside is more shiny than the upper side and completely lacks any opacity. The umbilicus is relatively large.

The shell is very similar to Aegopinella nitens and Aegopinella nitidula, but differs from them by having a white shell.

== Distribution ==
This species occurs throughout Europe including:

- Czech Republic
- Ukraine
- Great Britain
- Ireland
- and other European areas

== Habitat ==
Aegopinella pura lives in deciduous forests where it can be found in the litter layer, underneath deadwood and at the base of vegetation. It prefers dry to humid habitats, especially on calcareous substrate.

== Life cycle ==
In spring, the adult snails lay the eggs and die after that. Two years after hatching the juveniles reach their maturity.
