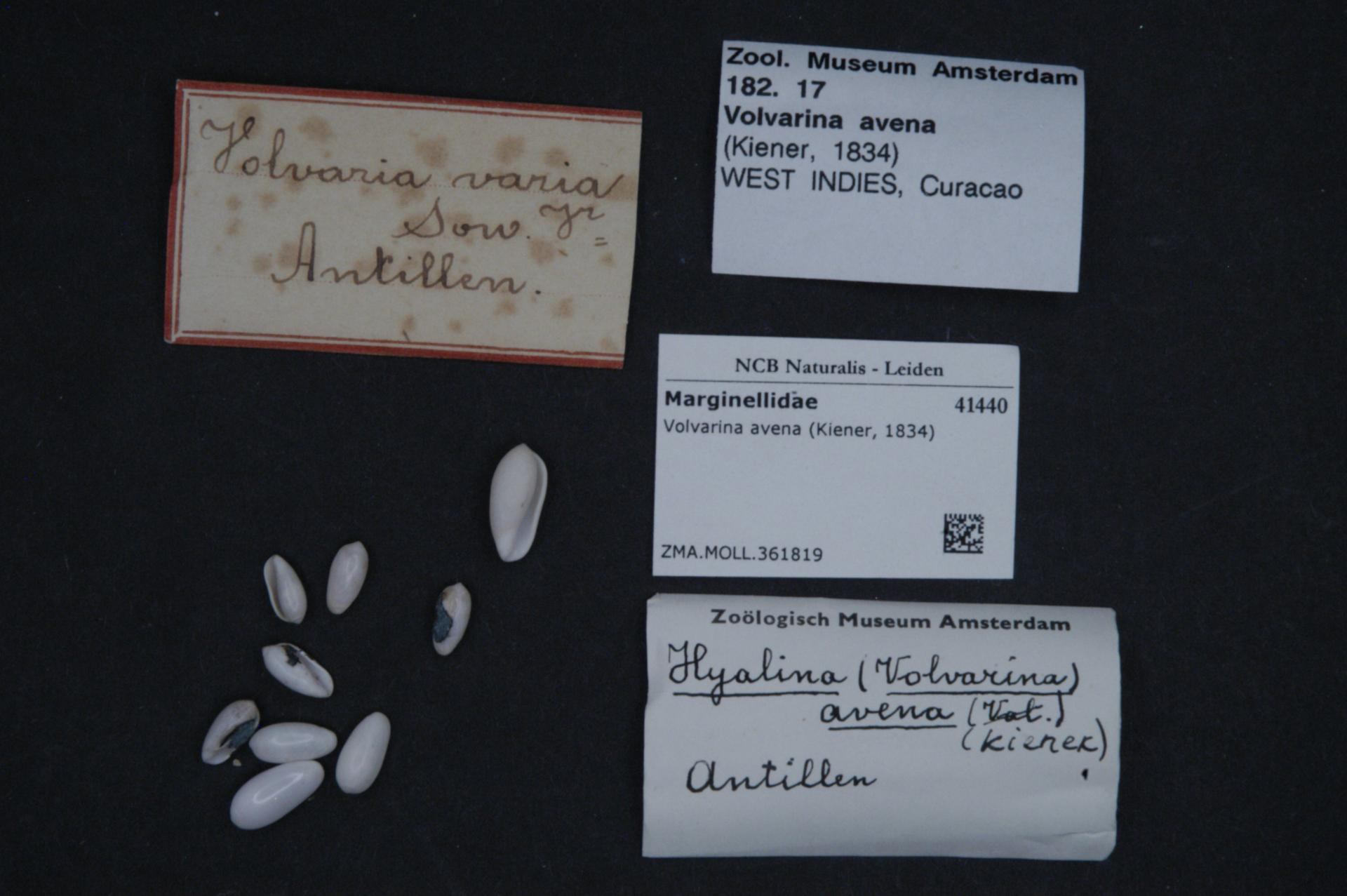

Scientific classification
- Kingdom: Animalia
- Phylum: Mollusca
- Class: Gastropoda
- Subclass: Caenogastropoda
- Order: Neogastropoda
- Family: Marginellidae
- Genus: Volvarina
- Species: V. avena

Binomial name
- Volvarina avena (Kiener, 1834)

Synonyms
- Hyalina avena (Kiener, 1834); Marginella avena Kiener, 1834 (original combination); Volvarina avena f. varia G. B. Sowerby, 1846; Volvarina livida Reeve, 1865; Volvarina vermiculata Jousseaume, 1875

= Volvarina avena =

Species of gastropod

Volvarina avena, common name the orange-banded marginella, is a species of sea snail, a marine gastropod mollusk in the family Marginellidae, the margin snails.

== Forma ==
- Volvarina avena f. beyerleana (Bernardi, 1953): synonym of Volvarina beyerleana (Bernardi, 1853)
- Volvarina avena f. varia G. B. Sowerby, 1846 accepted as Volvarina avena (Kiener, 1834)

== Description ==
The size of the shell varies between 9 mm and 16 mm.

== Distribution ==
This species occurs in the Caribbean Sea, the Gulf of Mexico and off the Lesser Antilles; in the Atlantic Ocean from North Carolina, USA, to Eastern Brazil.
