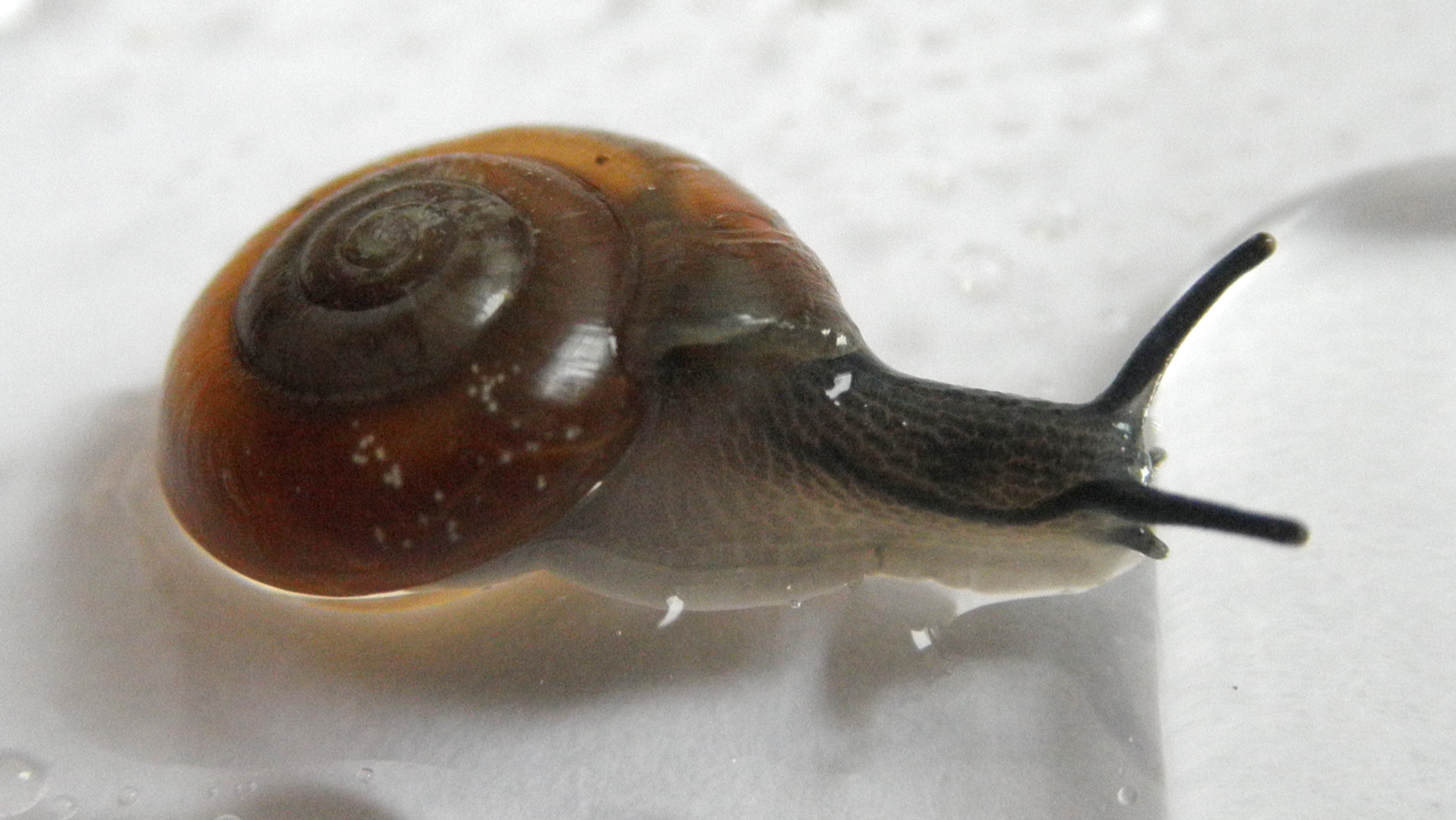
- a live Aegopinella nitidula

Conservation status
- Secure (NatureServe)

Scientific classification
- Kingdom: Animalia
- Phylum: Mollusca
- Class: Gastropoda
- Order: Stylommatophora
- Family: Gastrodontidae
- Genus: Aegopinella
- Species: A. nitidula

Binomial name
- Aegopinella nitidula (Draparnaud, 1805)
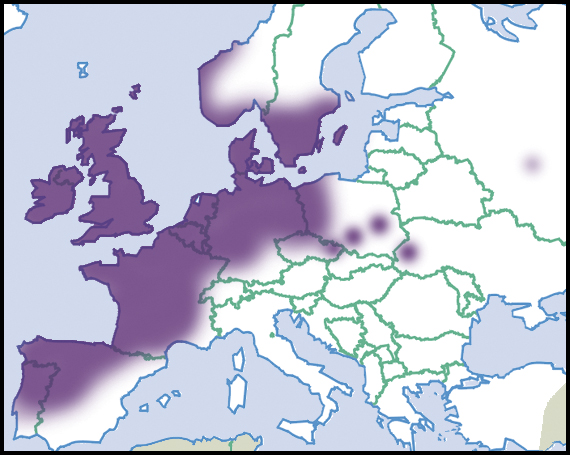

Synonyms
- Aegopinella (Politenella) nitidula (Draparnaud, 1805) (unaccepted subgeneric classification); Helix nitidula Draparnaud, 1805 (original combination)

= Aegopinella nitidula =

Species of gastropod

Aegopinella nitidula (previously known as Retinella nitidula), common name the waxy glass snail, is a species of small land snail, a terrestrial pulmonate gastropod mollusk in the family Gastrodontidae, the glass snails.

Forsyth et al. (2001) reviewed its identification and ecology.

== Description ==
For terms see gastropod shell.

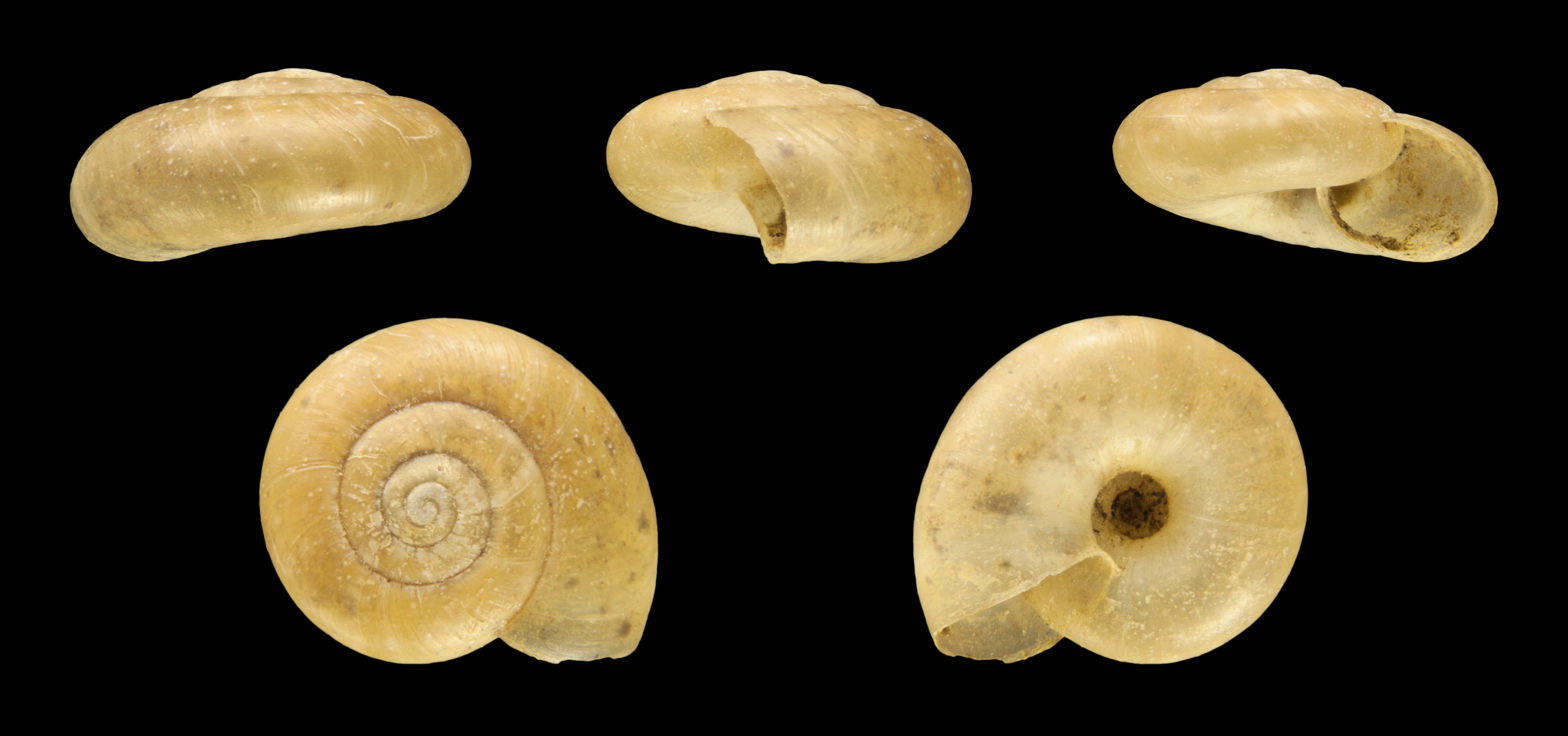
Shell

The diameter attains 8 mm (0.31 in), its height 6 mm (0.24 in).

The shell is amber-reddish in color, occasionally appearing whitish. It is milky white near the umbilicus. It is finely striated with spiral lines, forming a delicate reticular pattern, less prominent than in A. pura. The apex is strongly convex, featuring 3.5 to 4.5 convex whorls that increase regularly in size. The body whorl is not inflated near the aperture and does not descend. The aperture is slightly oblique, and the umbilicus is wide. The animal itself is bluish-grey with a lighter sole and bluish-black upper tentacles.

== Distribution ==
This shell is very similar to Aegopinella nitens, but has a different distribution being found in northwestern Europe.

This species occurs in these countries amongst others:

- Czech Republic
- Ukraine
- Great Britain
- Ireland
- Canada (Vancouver; introduced)

== Habitat ==
Aegiponella nitidula prefers moderately humid to humid sites in forests, but it can occur in a wide range of habitats, for example hedges, rocks and spring areas.
