= Hyalina vallei =

Scientific classification
- Kingdom: Animalia
- Phylum: Mollusca
- Class: Gastropoda
- Subclass: Caenogastropoda
- Order: Neogastropoda
- Family: Marginellidae
- Genus: Hyalina
- Species: H. vallei

Binomial name
- Hyalina vallei Espinosa & Ortea, 2002

Species of mollusc

Hyalina vallei is a species of sea snail, a marine gastropod mollusk in the family Marginellidae, the margin snails.

== Distribution ==
It lives at a depth of 6 to 8 m in the Cayo La Grifa and Golfo de Batabanó off Cuba, as well as in waters off Costa Rica and the Bahamas.
