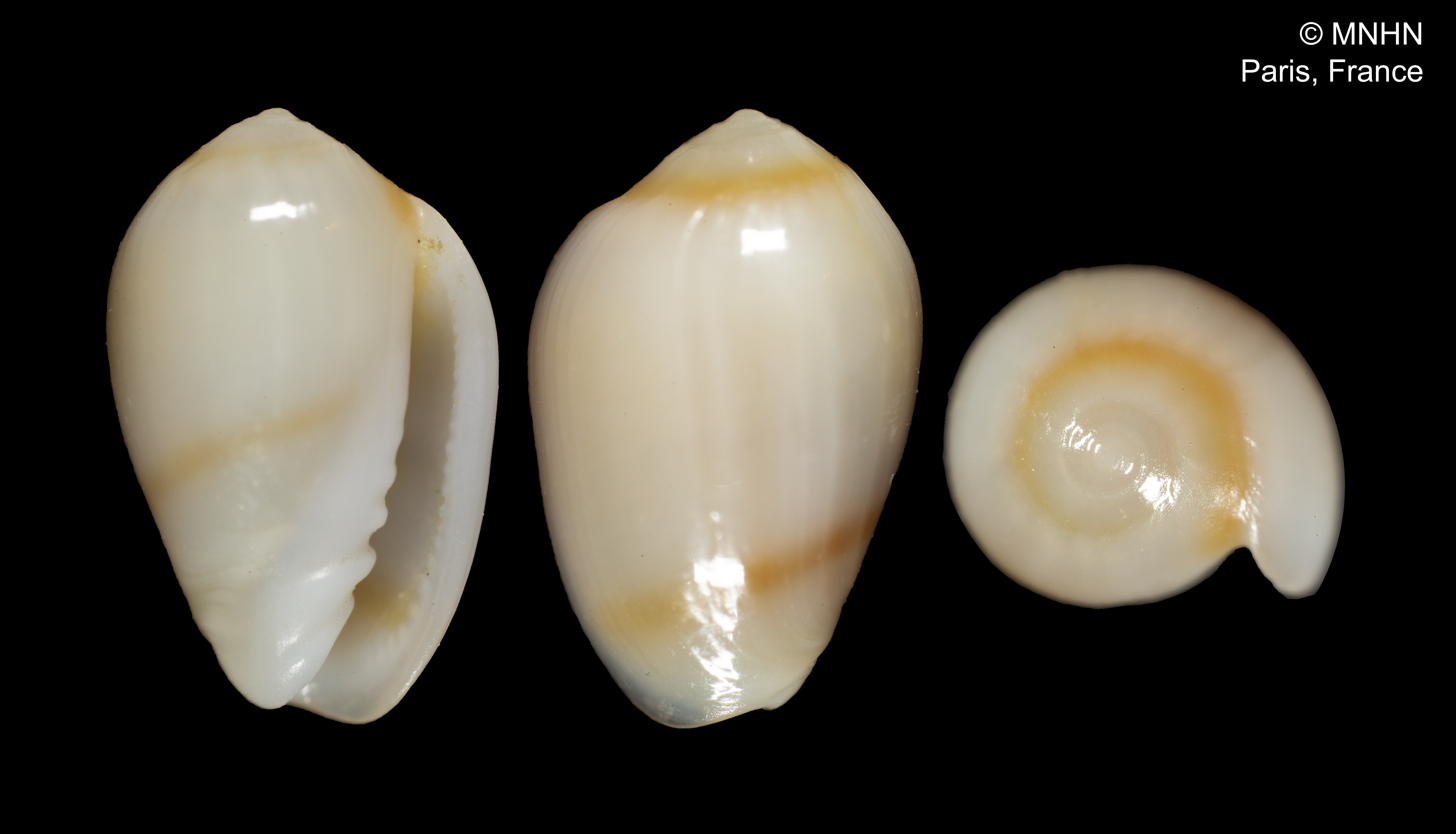
- Hyalina pallida shell

Scientific classification
- Kingdom: Animalia
- Phylum: Mollusca
- Class: Gastropoda
- Subclass: Caenogastropoda
- Order: Neogastropoda
- Family: Marginellidae
- Genus: Hyalina
- Species: H. pallida

Binomial name
- Hyalina pallida (Linnaeus, 1758)

Synonyms
- Bulla pallida Linnaeus, 1758 (basionym); Caribeginella flormarina Espinosa & Ortea, 1998; Hyalina pellucida Schumacher, 1817; Marginella (Volvarina) pallida (Linnaeus, 1767); Marginella pallida (Linnaeus, 1767); Volvarina tenuilabra (Tomlin, 1917)

= Hyalina pallida =

Species of gastropod

Hyalina pallida is a species of sea snail, a marine gastropod mollusk in the family Marginellidae, the margin snails.

== Distribution ==
This species occurs in the Gulf of Mexico, the Caribbean Sea and the Lesser Antilles.
