= Hyalina saintjames =

Scientific classification
- Kingdom: Animalia
- Phylum: Mollusca
- Class: Gastropoda
- Subclass: Caenogastropoda
- Order: Neogastropoda
- Family: Marginellidae
- Genus: Hyalina
- Species: H. saintjames

Binomial name
- Hyalina saintjames Ortea & Espinosa, 2016

Species of gastropod

Hyalina saintjames is a species of sea snails, a marine gastropod mollusc in the family Marginellidae, the margin snails.

== Distribution ==
Martinique.
