= Hyalina redferni =

Scientific classification
- Kingdom: Animalia
- Phylum: Mollusca
- Class: Gastropoda
- Subclass: Caenogastropoda
- Order: Neogastropoda
- Family: Marginellidae
- Genus: Hyalina
- Species: H. redferni

Binomial name
- Hyalina redferni Espinosa & Ortea, 2002

Species of gastropod

Hyalina redferni is a species of sea snail, a marine gastropod mollusk in the family Marginellidae, the margin snails.

This is a temporary name. It is unavailable because the type specimens are not fixed.
