= Volvarina ealesae =

Scientific classification
- Kingdom: Animalia
- Phylum: Mollusca
- Class: Gastropoda
- Subclass: Caenogastropoda
- Order: Neogastropoda
- Family: Marginellidae
- Genus: Volvarina
- Species: V. ealesae

Binomial name
- Volvarina ealesae (Powell, 1958)

Synonyms
- Hyalina ealesae (Powell, 1958); Marginella ealesae Powell, 1958

Species of gastropod

Volvarina ealesae is a species of sea snail, a marine gastropod mollusk in the family Marginellidae, the margin snails.
