= Volvarina gracilis =

Scientific classification
- Kingdom: Animalia
- Phylum: Mollusca
- Class: Gastropoda
- Subclass: Caenogastropoda
- Order: Neogastropoda
- Family: Marginellidae
- Subfamily: Marginellinae
- Genus: Volvarina
- Species: V. gracilis

Binomial name
- Volvarina gracilis (C. B. Adams, 1851)

Synonyms
- Hyalina gracilis (C. B. Adams, 1851) (original combination); Marginella bibalteata Reeve, 1865 junior subjective synonym; Marginella gracilis C. B. Adams, 1851; Volvarina bibalteata (Reeve, 1865)

Species of gastropod

Volvarina gracilis is a species of sea snail, a marine gastropod mollusk in the family Marginellidae, the margin snails.

== Description ==
The length of the shell attains 8 mm.

(Described as Marginella gracilis) The shape of the slender shell is between fusiform and cylindric. It is white, with three spiral bands of orange brown, of which the upper one appears on the spire, a part of the middle one is seen in the deflection of the suture in the last part of the penultimate whorl. The middle band is sometimes indistinct: smooth and shining. The apex is rather obtuse. The spire is moderately lengthened, with the outlines quite curvilinear. The shell consists of nearly four whorls, moderately convex, with the suture not very distinct. The body whorl is long. The aperture is long and narrow. The outer lip is moderately thickened and slightly incurved. The varix is slightly extended on the penultimate whorl. The columella shows four very oblique plaits.

== Distribution ==
This marine species occurs off Jamaica, Caribbean Sea and off Brazil in the Atlantic Ocean.
