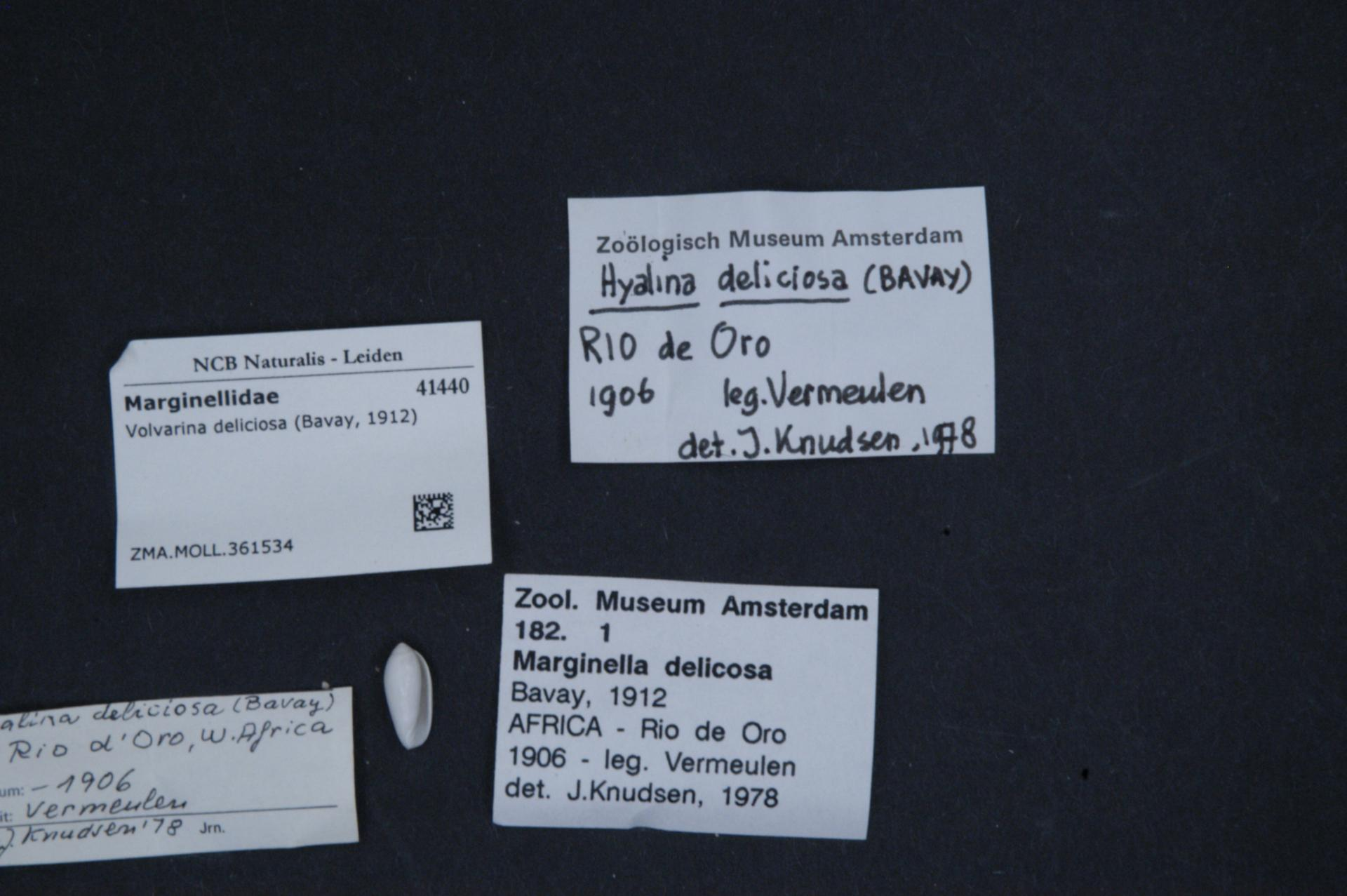
- Preserved specimen - Volvarina deliciosa

Scientific classification
- Kingdom: Animalia
- Phylum: Mollusca
- Class: Gastropoda
- Subclass: Caenogastropoda
- Order: Neogastropoda
- Family: Marginellidae
- Genus: Volvarina
- Species: V. deliciosa

Binomial name
- Volvarina deliciosa Bavay in Dautzenberg, 1913

Synonyms
- Marginella deliciosa Bavay, 1912; Prunum deliciosum (Bavay in Dautzenberg, 1912)

= Volvarina deliciosa =

Species of gastropod

Volvarina deliciosa is a species of sea snail, a marine gastropod mollusk in the family Marginellidae, the margin snails.
