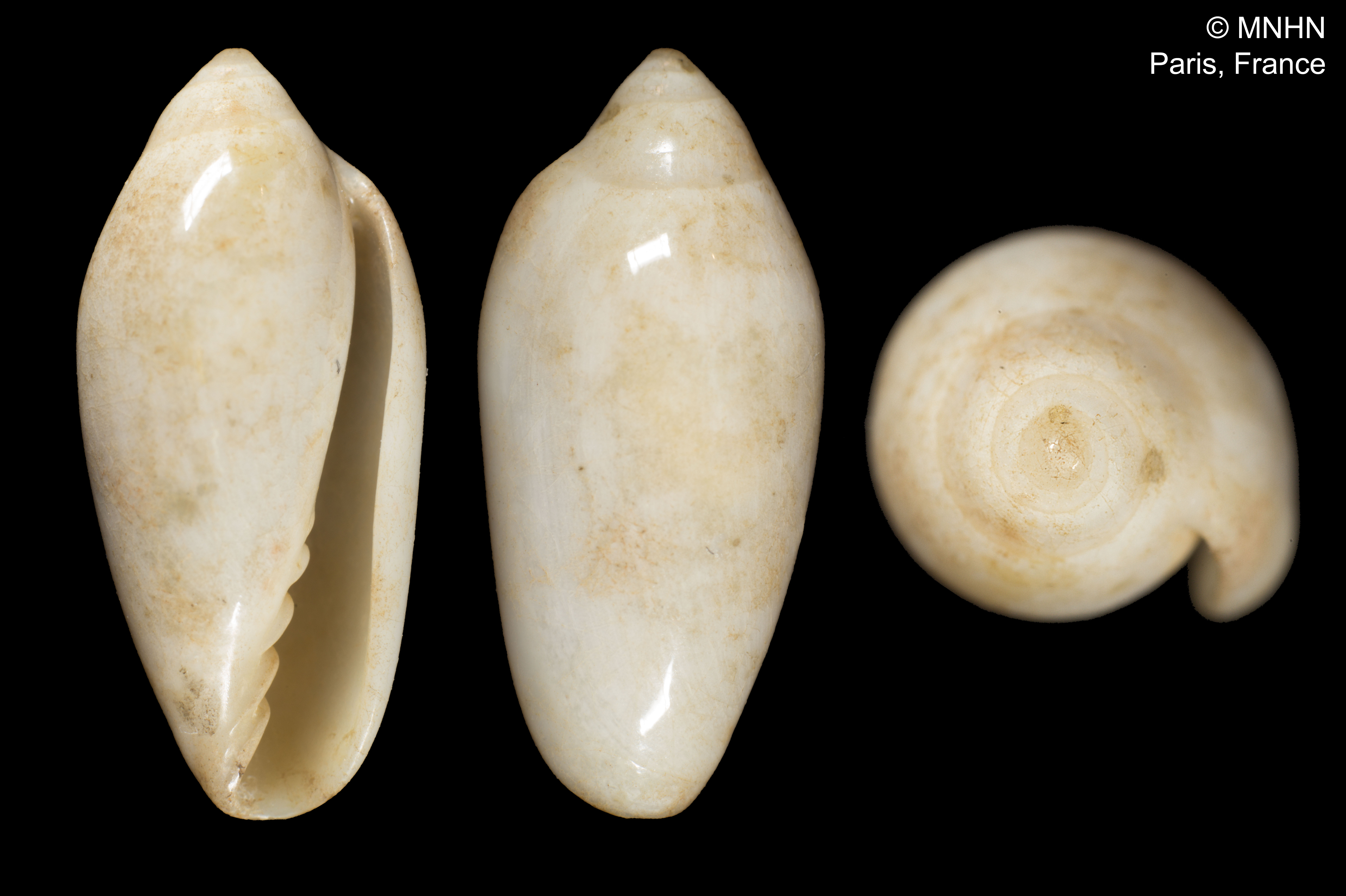
- Shell of Volvarina attenuata (syntype at MNHN, Paris)

Scientific classification
- Kingdom: Animalia
- Phylum: Mollusca
- Class: Gastropoda
- Subclass: Caenogastropoda
- Order: Neogastropoda
- Family: Marginellidae
- Genus: Volvarina
- Species: V. attenuata

Binomial name
- Volvarina attenuata (Reeve, 1865)

Synonyms
- Marginella attenuata Reeve, 1865; Marginella parvula Locard, 1897 (dubious synonym; preoccupied by Marginella (Volvarina) parvula Sacco, 1890); Marginella parvula var. elongata Locard, 1897 (dubious synonym; preoccupied by Marginella elongata Bellardi & Michelotti, 1841); Marginella paxillas Paetel, 1883; Marginella paxillus Reeve, 1865; Prunum attenuatum (Reeve, 1865); Volvarina paxillus (Reeve, 1865)

= Volvarina attenuata =

Species of gastropod

Volvarina attenuata, common name attenuated marginella, is a species of sea snail, a marine gastropod mollusk in the family Marginellidae, the margin snails.

== Description ==
The length of the shell attains 15.9 mm.

The shell is conically ovate, somewhat fusiform and transparent horny. The spire is a little exserted. The whorls are slightly swollen round the upper part and attenuated towards the base. The outer lip is flexuous. The columella shows obliquely four-plaited.

== Distribution ==
This marine species occurs off Australia (New South Wales, Western Australia).
