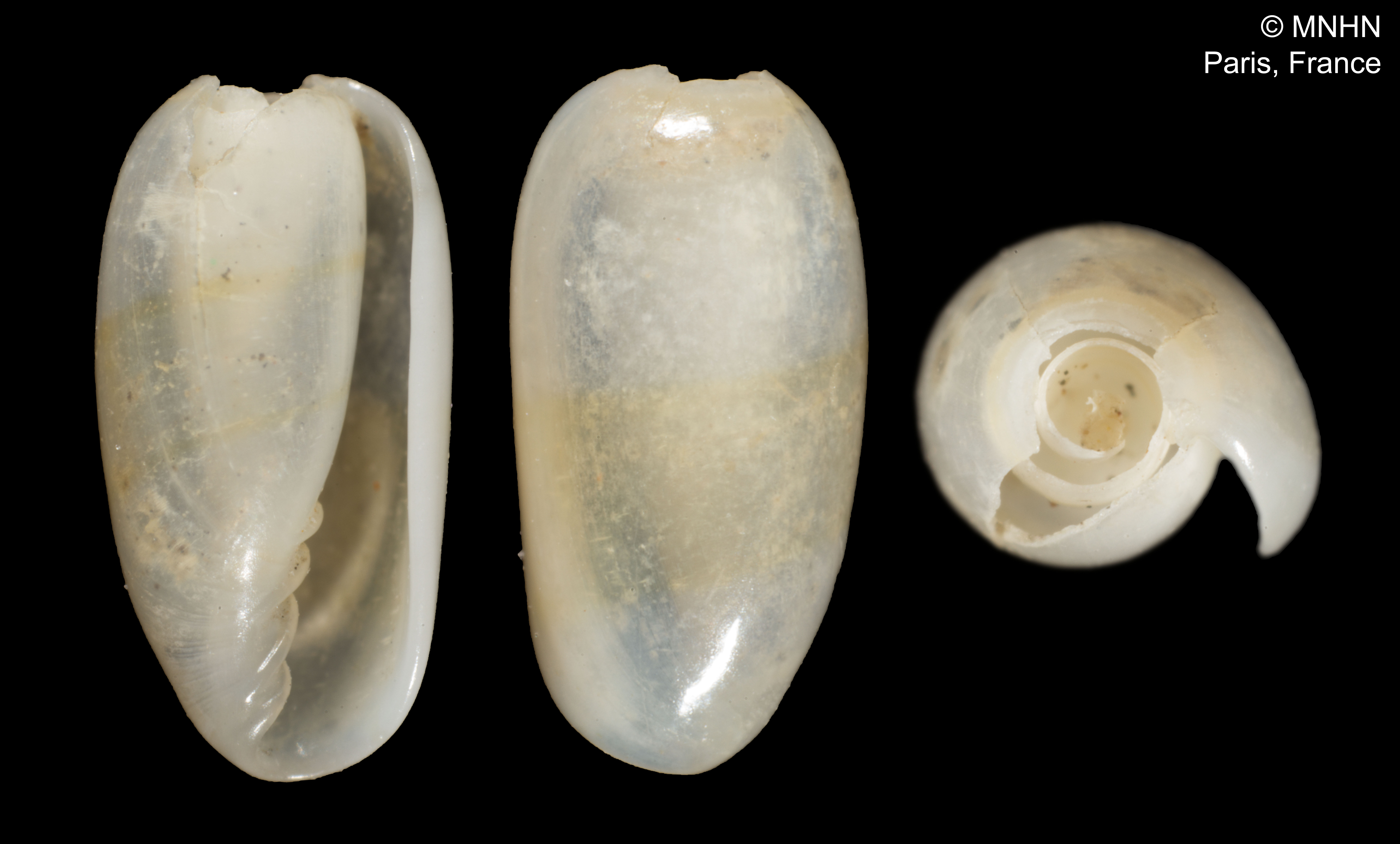
- Shell of Volvarina heterozona (syntype at MNHN, Paris)

Scientific classification
- Kingdom: Animalia
- Phylum: Mollusca
- Class: Gastropoda
- Subclass: Caenogastropoda
- Order: Neogastropoda
- Family: Marginellidae
- Subfamily: Marginellinae
- Genus: Volvarina
- Species: V. heterozona

Binomial name
- Volvarina heterozona Jousseaume, 1875

Synonyms
- Hyalina heterozona (Jousseaume, 1875)

= Volvarina heterozona =

Species of gastropod

Volvarina heterozona is a species of sea snail, a marine gastropod mollusk in the family Marginellidae, the margin snails.

== Description ==
The length of the shell attains 9 mm.

The small shell has a cylindrical shape and is rounded at both ends. Its right edge is almost straight, while the left describes a rounded curve. The shell is vitreous white, thin, fragile, transparent, smooth and shiny. There is in the middle of the body whorl a wide band of a pale yellow, continuing on the bead of the external edge. There is also near the suture a net of same colour.

The spire is made up of 4 whorls. The body whorl constitutes almost the entire shell, while the first three form, at the rear end, a small lowered summit. The suture that separates them is obliterated by a coating which would make it impossible to follow its contour, without the presence of the small yellowish edging which we have pointed out.

The aperture, placed on the right side of the underside, occupies almost its entire length. Its back is narrow, and where it ends in a channel, it widens a little forward, and ends in a wide gutter. Its outer edge, smooth and opaque, is lined on the outside with a wide longitudinal bead. The inner lip is convex posteriorly and concave in its anterior third. It is on this part that rise 4 plicae, all the more salient and oblique as they are earlier. The first joins the outer edge to which it unites, after having described a spiral curve.

== Distribution ==
This marine species occurs off Aruba, Caribbean Sea.
