= Volvarina subtriplicata =

Scientific classification
- Kingdom: Animalia
- Phylum: Mollusca
- Class: Gastropoda
- Subclass: Caenogastropoda
- Order: Neogastropoda
- Family: Marginellidae
- Subfamily: Marginellinae
- Genus: Volvarina
- Species: V. subtriplicata

Binomial name
- Volvarina subtriplicata (d’Orbigny, 1842)

Synonyms
- Hyalina subtriplicata (d'Orbigny, 1842); Marginella subtriplicata d'Orbigny, 1842 (original combination)

Species of gastropod

Volvarina subtriplicata is a species of sea snail, a marine gastropod mollusk in the family Marginellidae, the margin snails.

== Distribution ==
This species occurs in the Caribbean Sea, the Gulf of Mexico and the Lesser Antilles.
