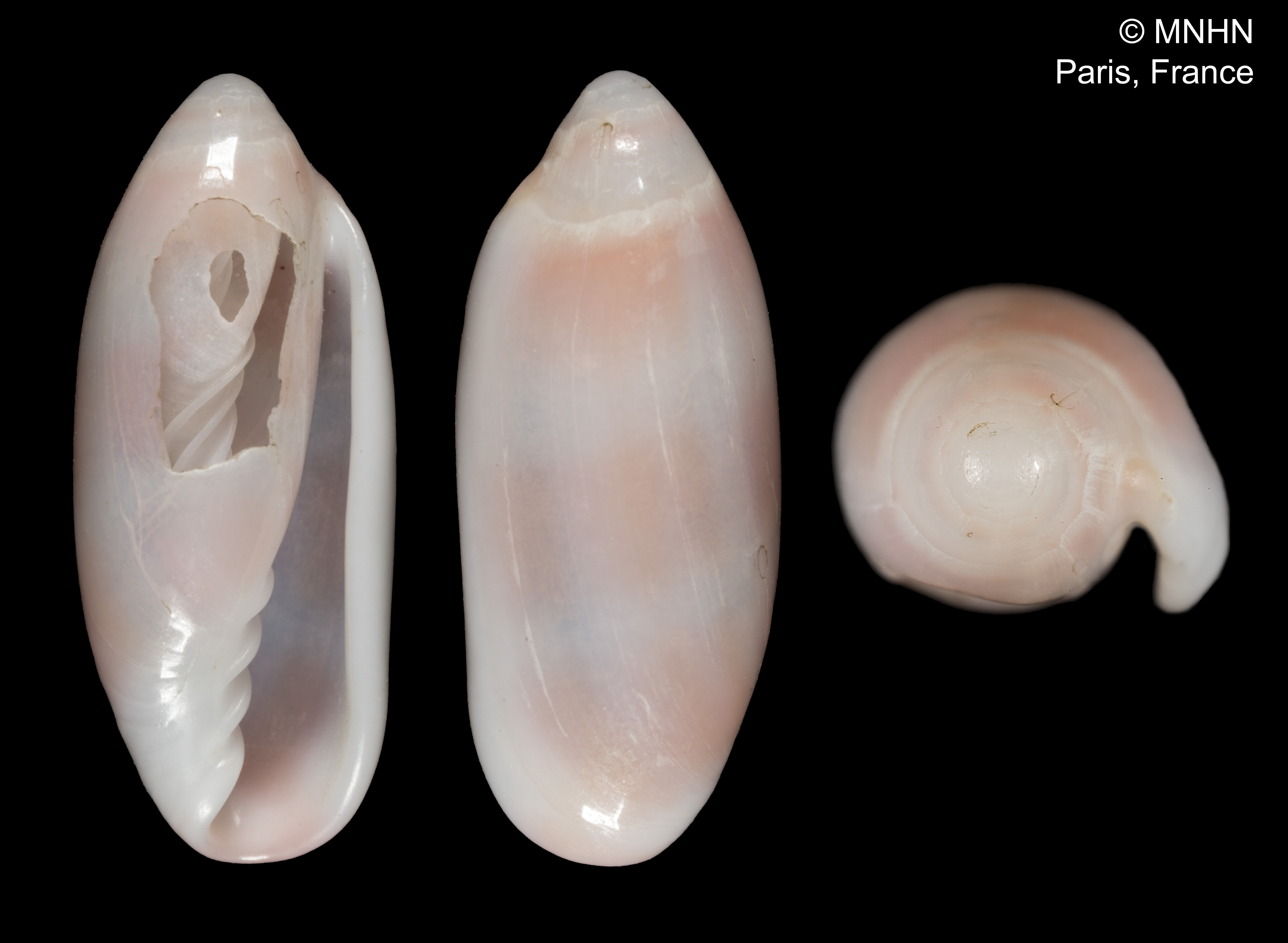
- Syntype shell at MNHN, Paris

Scientific classification
- Kingdom: Animalia
- Phylum: Mollusca
- Class: Gastropoda
- Subclass: Caenogastropoda
- Order: Neogastropoda
- Family: Marginellidae
- Subfamily: Marginellinae
- Genus: Volvarina
- Species: V. beyerleana

Binomial name
- Volvarina beyerleana (Bernardi, 1853)

Synonyms
- Marginella beyerleana Bernardi, 1853 (original combination); Volvarina avena f. beyerleana (Bernardi, 1853)

= Volvarina beyerleana =

Species of gastropod

Volvarina beyerleana is a species of sea snail, a marine gastropod mollusk in the family Marginellidae, the margin snails.

== Description ==
The length of the shell attains 12,5 mm, its diameter 5 mm.

The small shell is oblong. It is white or rosy-white, surrounded by three horizontal rose-colored or purple-pink bands formed of spots that are usually square or close together. The spire is obtuse conical, with indistinct whorls. The columella contains four equally distinct folds, the upper one appearing a little smaller. The aperture is narrow at the top, wider at the bottom. The outer lip is straight, thickened at the outside, and showing no trace of crenellation on the inner part.

== Distribution ==
This marine species occurs off Mexico.
