= Plesiocystiscus myrmecoon =

Scientific classification
- Kingdom: Animalia
- Phylum: Mollusca
- Class: Gastropoda
- Subclass: Caenogastropoda
- Order: Neogastropoda
- Family: Cystiscidae
- Subfamily: Plesiocystiscinae
- Genus: Plesiocystiscus
- Species: P. myrmecoon

Binomial name
- Plesiocystiscus myrmecoon (Dall, 1919)

Synonyms
- Hyalina myrmecoon Dall, 1919

Species of gastropod

Plesiocystiscus myrmecoon is a species of sea snail, a marine gastropod mollusk, in the family Cystiscidae.
