= Volvarina styria =

Scientific classification
- Kingdom: Animalia
- Phylum: Mollusca
- Class: Gastropoda
- Subclass: Caenogastropoda
- Order: Neogastropoda
- Family: Marginellidae
- Subfamily: Marginellinae
- Genus: Volvarina
- Species: V. styria

Binomial name
- Volvarina styria (Dall, 1889)

Synonyms
- Hyalina styria (Dall, 1889); Marginella styria Dall, 1889; Prunum styrium (Dall, 1889)

Species of gastropod

Volvarina styria is a species of sea snail, a marine gastropod mollusk in the family Marginellidae, the margin snails.

== Description ==
The length of shell attains 5.55 mm, its diameter 2 mm.

(Original description) The slender shell is extremely lucid, glassy or colored by the soft parts showing through. It contains 4½ whorls. The spire is conical, rounded, and rather blunt. The suture is visible, whiter than the rest of the shell, being thicker and more opaque. The shell is subfusiform, the convexity of the left side somewhat greater than that of the right. The aperture is very narrow. The outer lip is hardly thickened, produced and impressed toward its middle part. The columella is four-plaited, without callus. The aperture measures less than two thirds the length of the shell.
