= Prunum torticulum =

Scientific classification
- Kingdom: Animalia
- Phylum: Mollusca
- Class: Gastropoda
- Subclass: Caenogastropoda
- Order: Neogastropoda
- Family: Marginellidae
- Genus: Prunum
- Species: P. torticulum

Binomial name
- Prunum torticulum (Dall, 1881)

Species of gastropod

Prunum torticulum is a species of sea snail, a marine gastropod mollusk in the family Marginellidae, the margin snails.

== Distribution ==
P. torticulum can be found in the Gulf of Mexico, ranging from Georgia to Puerto Rico.
