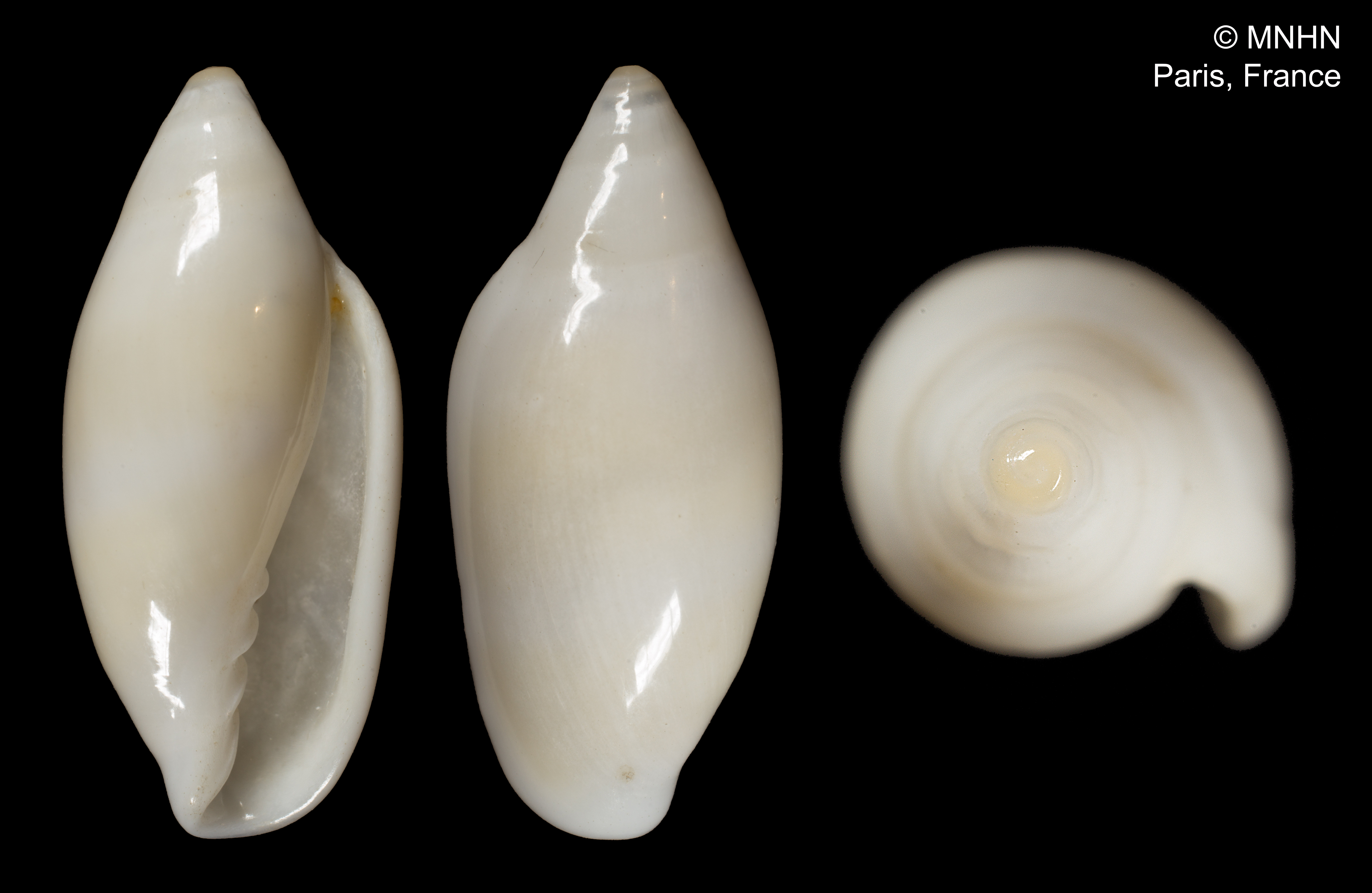
- Shell of Volvarina warrenii (syntype at MNHN, Paris)

Scientific classification
- Kingdom: Animalia
- Phylum: Mollusca
- Class: Gastropoda
- Subclass: Caenogastropoda
- Order: Neogastropoda
- Family: Marginellidae
- Subfamily: Marginellinae
- Genus: Volvarina
- Species: V. warrenii

Binomial name
- Volvarina warrenii (Marrat, 1876)

Synonyms
- Hyalina warrenii (Marrat, 1876); Marginella hahni Mabille, 1884; Marginella warrenii Marrat, 1876 (original combination); Volvarina patagonica (E. von Martens, 1881) junior subjective synonym

= Volvarina warrenii =

Species of gastropod

Volvarina warrenii is a species of sea snail, a marine gastropod mollusk in the family Marginellidae, the margin snails.

== Description ==
The length of the shell attains 20.3 mm, its diameter 8 mm.

(Original description in Latin) The fusiform-oblong shell is glaucous and milky. It is girdled with two spiral, orange-brown bands. The conical shell is slightly obtuse and has a blunt tip. The outer lip is somewhat flexuous. The columella is four-plaited.

== Distribution ==
This marine species occurs off Argentina.
