= Volvarina albolineata =

Scientific classification
- Kingdom: Animalia
- Phylum: Mollusca
- Class: Gastropoda
- Subclass: Caenogastropoda
- Order: Neogastropoda
- Family: Marginellidae
- Genus: Volvarina
- Species: V. albolineata

Binomial name
- Volvarina albolineata (d’Orbigny, 1842)

Species of gastropod

Volvarina albolineata is a species of sea snail, a marine gastropod mollusk in the family Marginellidae, the margin snails.

== Description ==
The length of the shell attains 5.2 mm, its diameter 2 mm.

== Distribution ==
This marine species occurs off Cuba in the Caribbean Sea.
