= Volvarina borroi =

Scientific classification
- Kingdom: Animalia
- Phylum: Mollusca
- Class: Gastropoda
- Subclass: Caenogastropoda
- Order: Neogastropoda
- Family: Marginellidae
- Subfamily: Marginellinae
- Genus: Volvarina
- Species: V. borroi

Binomial name
- Volvarina borroi (Espinosa & Ortea, 1998)

Synonyms
- Hyalina borroi Espinosa & Ortea, 1998 (basionym)

Species of gastropod

Volvarina borroi is a species of sea snail, a marine gastropod mollusk in the family Marginellidae, the margin snails.

== Distribution ==
This marine species occurs in the Gulf of Mexico.
