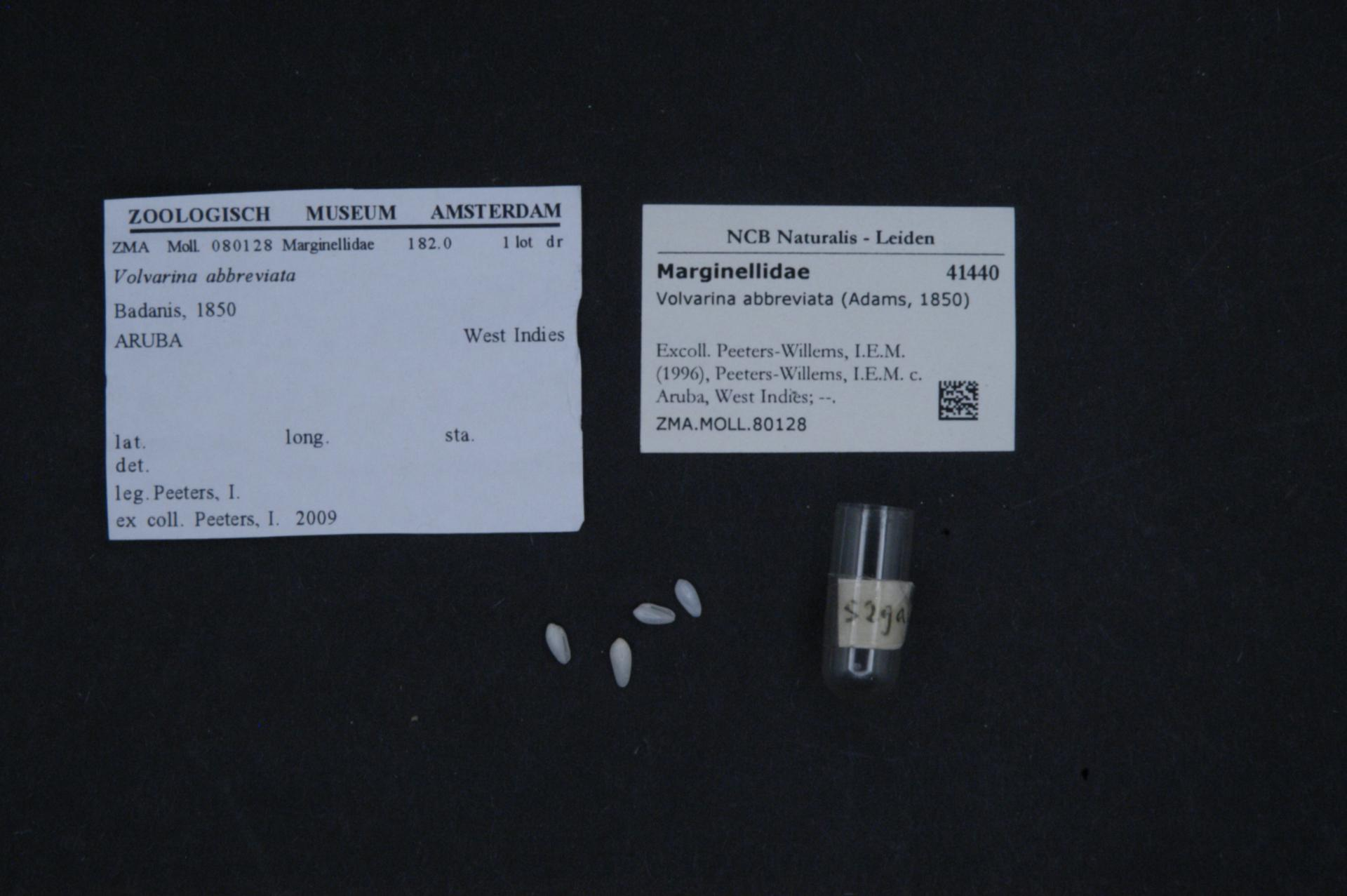

Scientific classification
- Kingdom: Animalia
- Phylum: Mollusca
- Class: Gastropoda
- Subclass: Caenogastropoda
- Order: Neogastropoda
- Family: Marginellidae
- Genus: Volvarina
- Species: V. abbreviata

Binomial name
- Volvarina abbreviata (C. B. Adams, 1850)

Synonyms
- Hyalina lactea (Kiener, 1841); Marginella abbreviata C.B. Adams, 1850; Marginella abreviata Petit, 1851; Marginella bella auct.; Marginella lactea Kiener, 1841 (invalid: junior homonym of Marginella lactea Swainson, 1840); Volvarina lactea Kiener, 1841 (invalid: junior homonym of Marginella lactea Swainson, 1840); Prunum abbreviatum (C.B. Adams, 1850); Volvarina lactea (Kiener, 1841) ·

= Volvarina abbreviata =

Species of gastropod

Volvarina abbreviata is a species of sea snail, a marine gastropod mollusk in the family Marginellidae, the margin snails.

== Description ==
The shell is oblong, but much contracted anteriorly. The shell is white, smooth and shining. The spire is very short. The apex is rather obtuse. The shell contains about 3⅓ whorls. The outer lip is incurved and contracting the aperture. The varix produces a little way on the spire. The columella with shows four plaits of which the upper one is small.

== Distribution ==
This marine species occurs off Aruba, Caribbean Sea.
