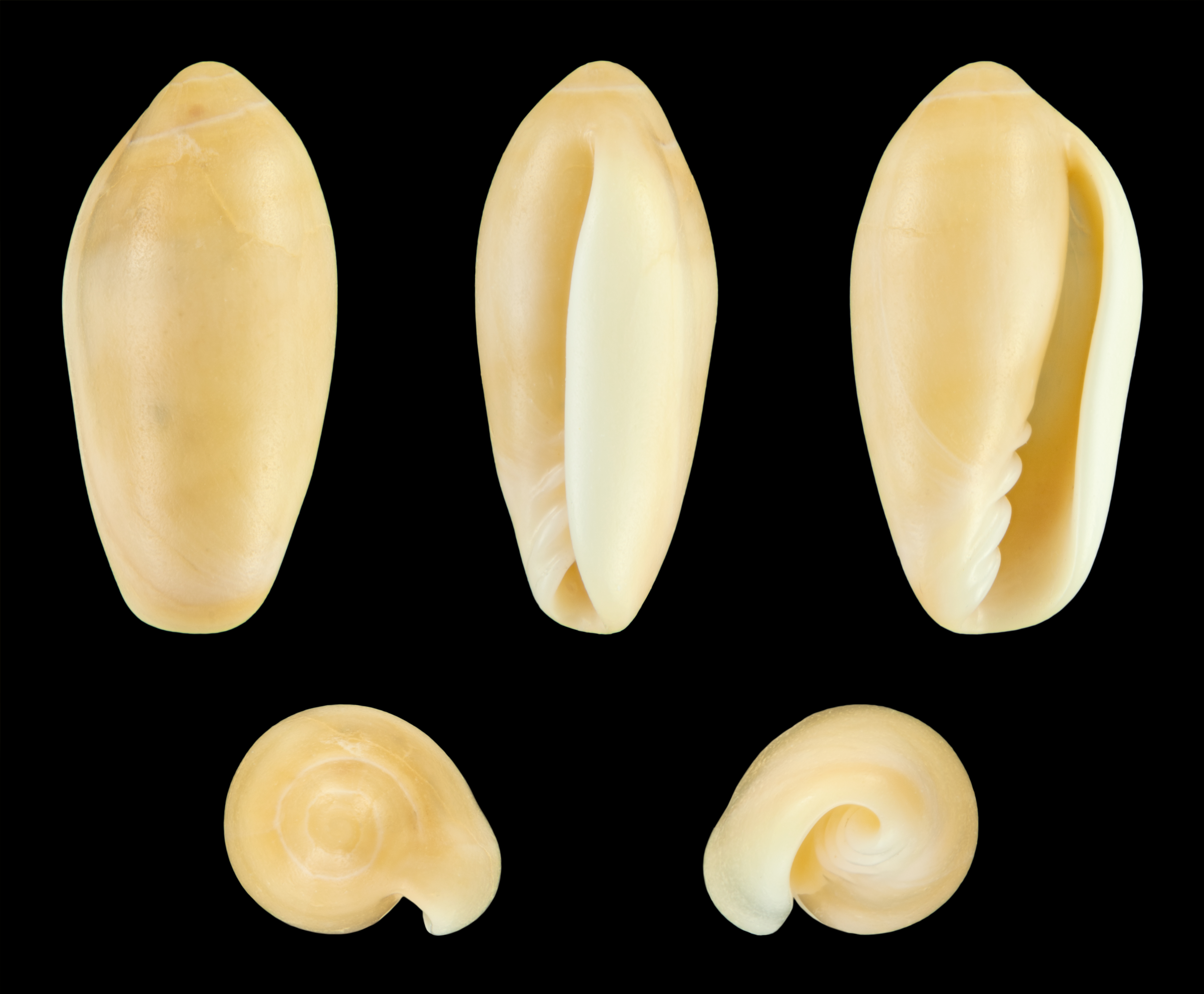

Scientific classification
- Kingdom: Animalia
- Phylum: Mollusca
- Class: Gastropoda
- Subclass: Caenogastropoda
- Order: Neogastropoda
- Family: Marginellidae
- Subfamily: Marginellinae
- Genus: Volvarina
- Species: V. mitrella

Binomial name
- Volvarina mitrella (Risso, 1826)

Synonyms
- Hyalina secalina (R. A. Philippi, 1844); Marginella (Volvarina) nitida Hinds, 1844; Marginella calameli Jousseaume, 1872; Marginella inflexa G. B. Sowerby II, 1846; Marginella nitida Hinds, 1844; Marginella secalina R. A. Philippi, 1844 junior subjective synonym; Marginella secalina var. bizonata Weinkauff, 1880; Voluta mitrella Risso, 1826 (original combination); Voluta quadriplicata Risso, 1826; Volvarina mitrella var. curta Monterosato, 1884; Volvarina quadriplicata (Risso, 1826) ·

= Volvarina mitrella =

Species of gastropod

Volvarina mitrella is a species of sea snail, a marine gastropod mollusk in the family Marginellidae, the margin snails.

== Description ==
The length of the shell attains 99 mm.

== Distribution ==
This marine species occurs in the Mediterranean Sea off Italy, Malta, Morocco, Algeria and Greece.
