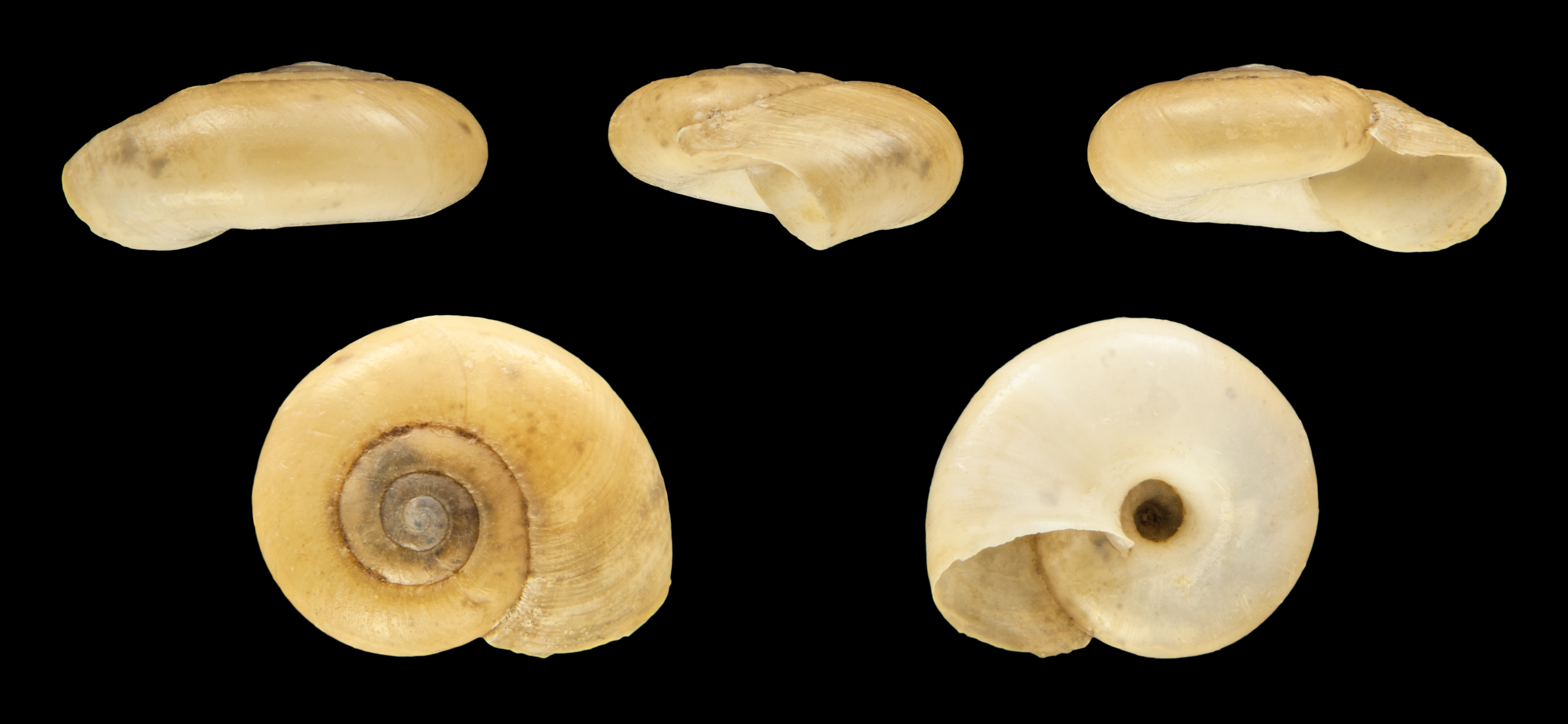
- Shell of Aegopinella nitens

Scientific classification
- Kingdom: Animalia
- Phylum: Mollusca
- Class: Gastropoda
- Order: Stylommatophora
- Family: Gastrodontidae
- Genus: Aegopinella
- Species: A. nitens

Binomial name
- Aegopinella nitens (Michaud, 1831)
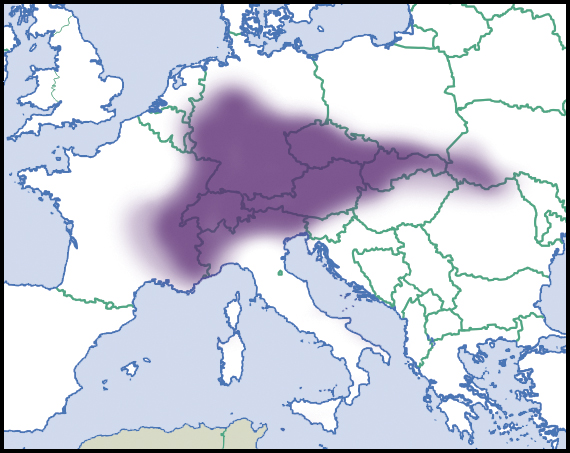

Synonyms
- Aegopinella (Politenella) nitens (Michaud, 1831) (unaccepted subgeneric classification); Helix nitens Michaud, 1831 (original combination); Hyalina nitens (Michaud, 1831) superseded combination

= Aegopinella nitens =

Species of gastropod

Aegopinella nitens is a species of small land snail, a terrestrial pulmonate gastropod mollusk in the family Gastrodontidae, the glass snails.

== Description ==
The diameter of the shell attains 14 mm (0.55 in), its height 5.5 mm (0.22 in).

(Original description of Helix nitens Michaud, 1831 in Latin) The shell is orbicular and depressed, with a prominent, wide umbilicus. It is thin, transparent, and smooth to the touch, featuring very fine longitudinal striations. The coloration is often dark horn-like, sometimes greenish-white, and paler on the underside. The shell contains four nearly flat whorls. The aperture is depressed, oblique, and expansive, with a simple, acute peristome.

It is distinct from Aegopinella nitidula by its last quarter of the whorl being flattened and sometimes curving slightly downwards.

== Distribution ==
This species occurs in the Alps, Western Carpathian Mountains, German Highlands and Czech Highlands, Ukraine and other countries.
