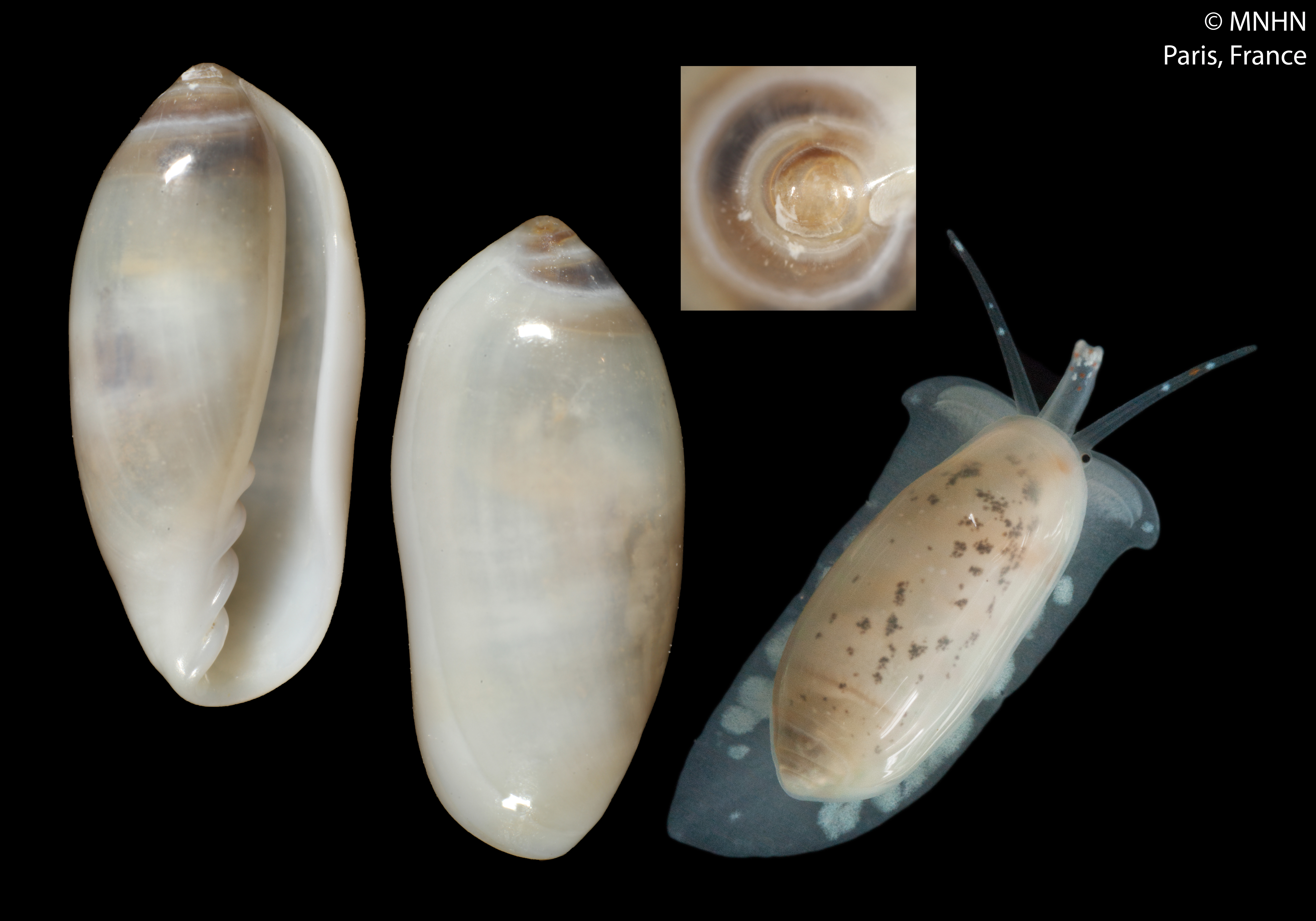
- Shell and animal of Volvarina laurenti (holotype at MNHN, Paris)

Scientific classification
- Kingdom: Animalia
- Phylum: Mollusca
- Class: Gastropoda
- Subclass: Caenogastropoda
- Order: Neogastropoda
- Family: Marginellidae
- Subfamily: Marginellinae
- Genus: Volvarina
- Species: V. laurenti

Binomial name
- Volvarina laurenti Espinosa & Ortea, 2012

= Volvarina laurenti =

Species of gastropod

Volvarina laurenti is a species of sea snail, a marine gastropod mollusk in the family Marginellidae, the margin snails.

The species is named in honour of malacologist Laurent Charles, who was a curator at the Natural History Museum of Bordeaux, France.

== Description ==
Volvarina laurenti has a shell that is small-medium-sized for its genus, with a shape that is elongated and narrow subcylindrical. It has a smooth appearance with two depressions, one located in the central portion and another towards the whorl sholder. The mantle is milky in colouration, interrupted by black spots of various sizes. Four unequal folds compose the columella, with the anterior two being more developed than the posterior ones. The protoconch its composed of two small whorls that take up 12% of the shell, while the rest consists of a single large whorl. The body of the snail is a translucent white, interrupted by white patches along the side of the foot. Due to its characteristic colour pattern, this species is not really comparable to others in its genus. The length of the shell attains 7.38 mm, its diameter is 3.38 mm.

== Distribution ==
This marine species occurs off Guadeloupe in the Caribbean Sea, specifically at around 3 m depth near Grand Cul-de-Sac Marin.
