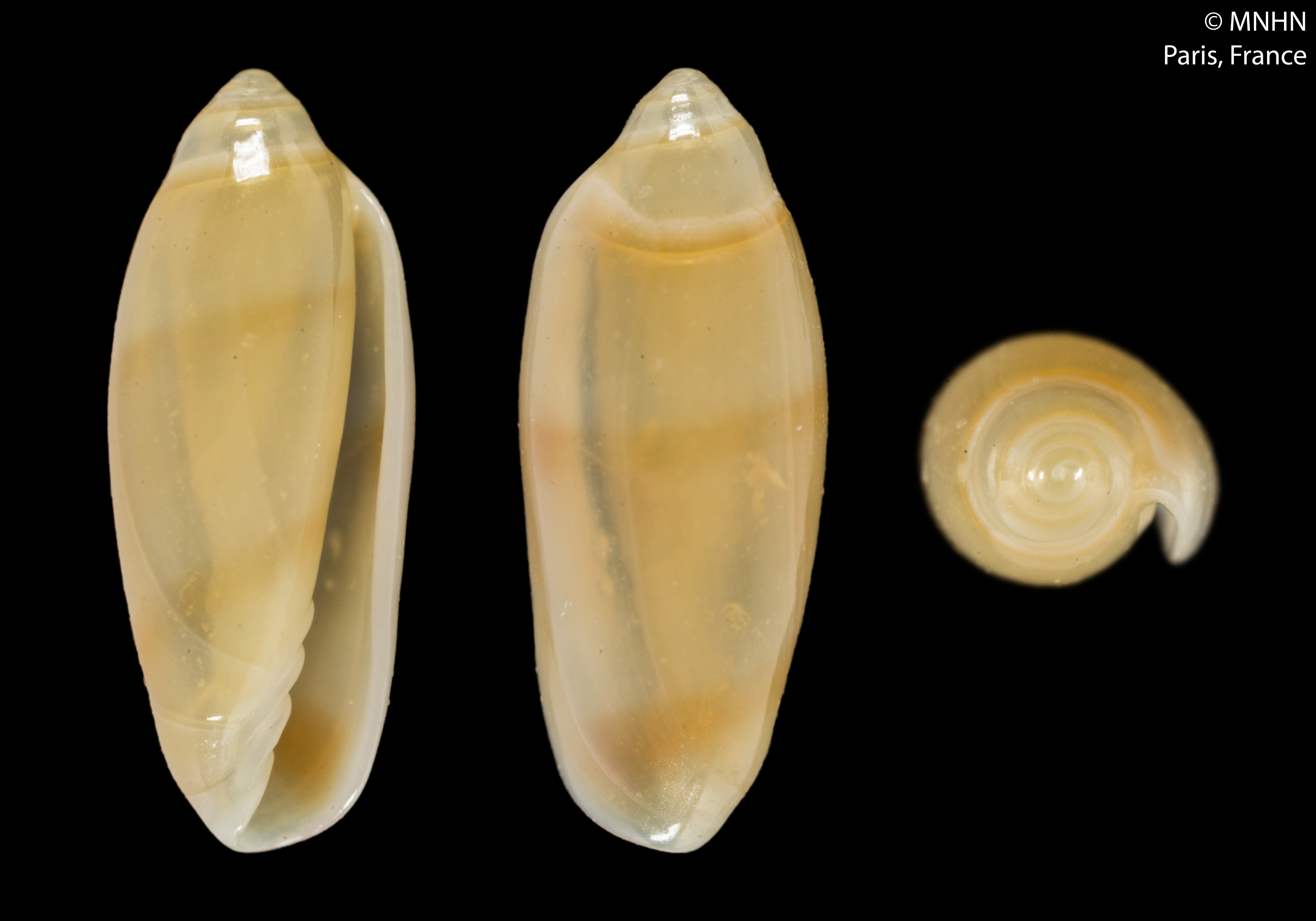
- Shell of Volvarina elgoyhenae (holotype in the MNHN, Paris)

Scientific classification
- Kingdom: Animalia
- Phylum: Mollusca
- Class: Gastropoda
- Subclass: Caenogastropoda
- Order: Neogastropoda
- Family: Marginellidae
- Subfamily: Marginellinae
- Genus: Volvarina
- Species: V. elgoyhenae

Binomial name
- Volvarina elgoyhenae Ortea, 2014

= Volvarina elgoyhenae =

Species of gastropod

Volvarina elgoyhenae is a species of sea snail, a marine gastropod mollusk in the family Marginellidae, the margin snails.

== Description ==
=== Shell characteristics ===
- Size: The shell is very small, with the holotype measuring approximately 7.02 mm in length and 2.6 mm in diameter.
- Shape: Like other members of the genus Volvarina, the shell is typically elongate, cylindrical, and smooth.
- Appearance: Marginellid shells are generally glossy and often colorful, though specific coloration details for this species often require examination of fresh specimens.

== Distribution ==
This marine species occurs off Guadeloupe in the Caribbean Sea.
