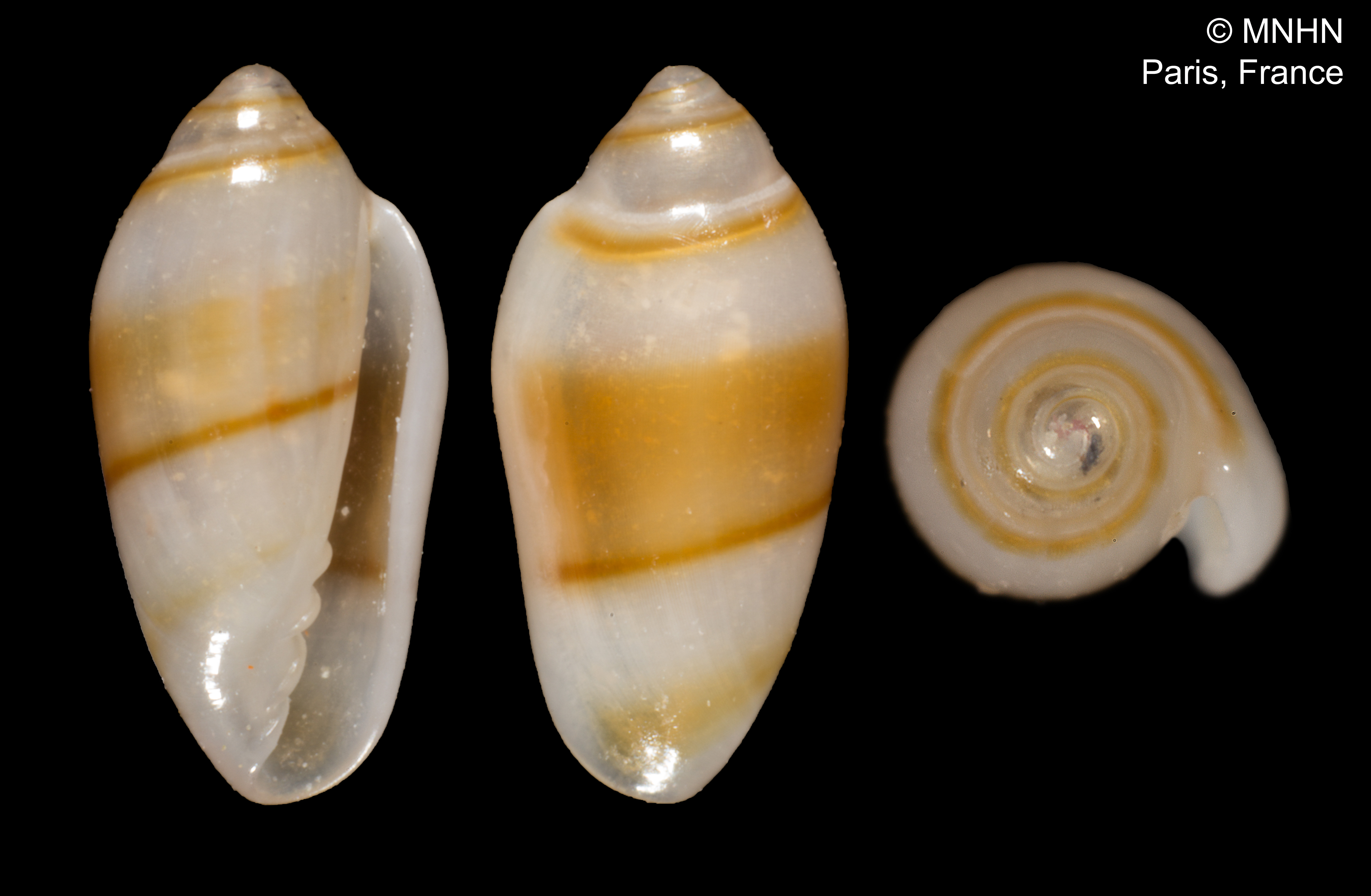
- Shell of Volvarina aliceae (holotype at MNHN, Paris)

Scientific classification
- Kingdom: Animalia
- Phylum: Mollusca
- Class: Gastropoda
- Subclass: Caenogastropoda
- Order: Neogastropoda
- Family: Marginellidae
- Subfamily: Marginellinae
- Genus: Volvarina
- Species: V. aliceae

Binomial name
- Volvarina aliceae Espinosa & Ortea, 2012

Synonyms
- Volvarina (Creolina) aliceae Espinosa & Ortea, 2012

= Volvarina aliceae =

Species of gastropod

Volvarina aliceae is a species of sea snail, a marine gastropod mollusk in the family Marginellidae, the margin snails.

== Description ==
The length of the shell attains 4.1 mm, its diameter 2.02 mm.

== Distribution ==
This marine species occurs off Guadeloupe in the Caribbean Sea.
