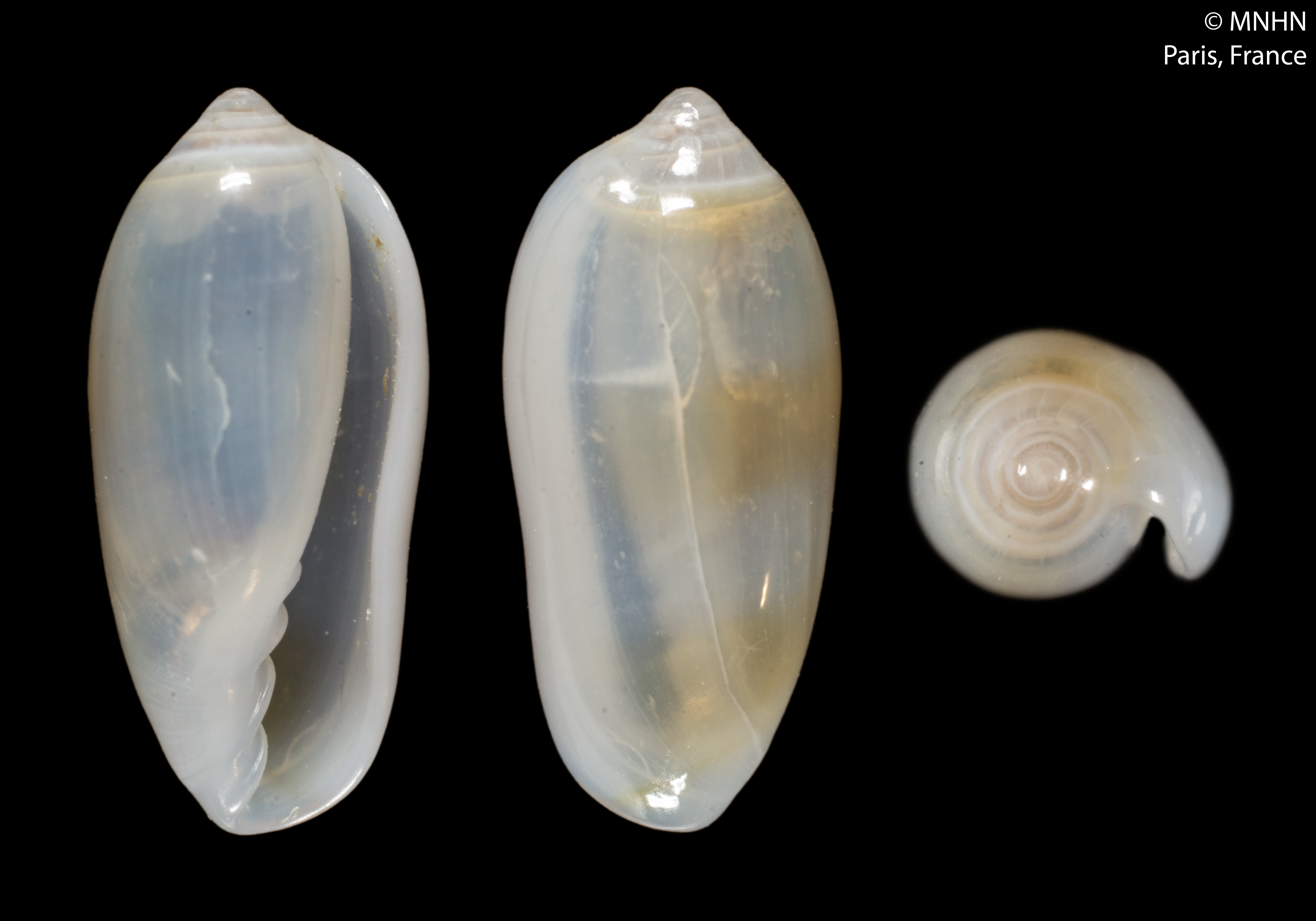
- Shell of Volvarina thomsonae (holotype in the MNHN, Paris)

Scientific classification
- Kingdom: Animalia
- Phylum: Mollusca
- Class: Gastropoda
- Subclass: Caenogastropoda
- Order: Neogastropoda
- Family: Marginellidae
- Subfamily: Marginellinae
- Genus: Volvarina
- Species: V. thomsonae

Binomial name
- Volvarina thomsonae Ortea, 2014

Synonyms
- Volvarina (Ctenoina) thomsonae Ortea, 2014 ·

= Volvarina thomsonae =

Species of gastropod

Volvarina thomsonae is a species of sea snail, a marine gastropod mollusk in the family Marginellidae, the margin snails.

== Description ==
The length of the shell attains 7.98 mm, its diameter 3.51 mm.

== Distribution ==
This marine species occurs off Guadeloupe in the Caribbean Sea.
