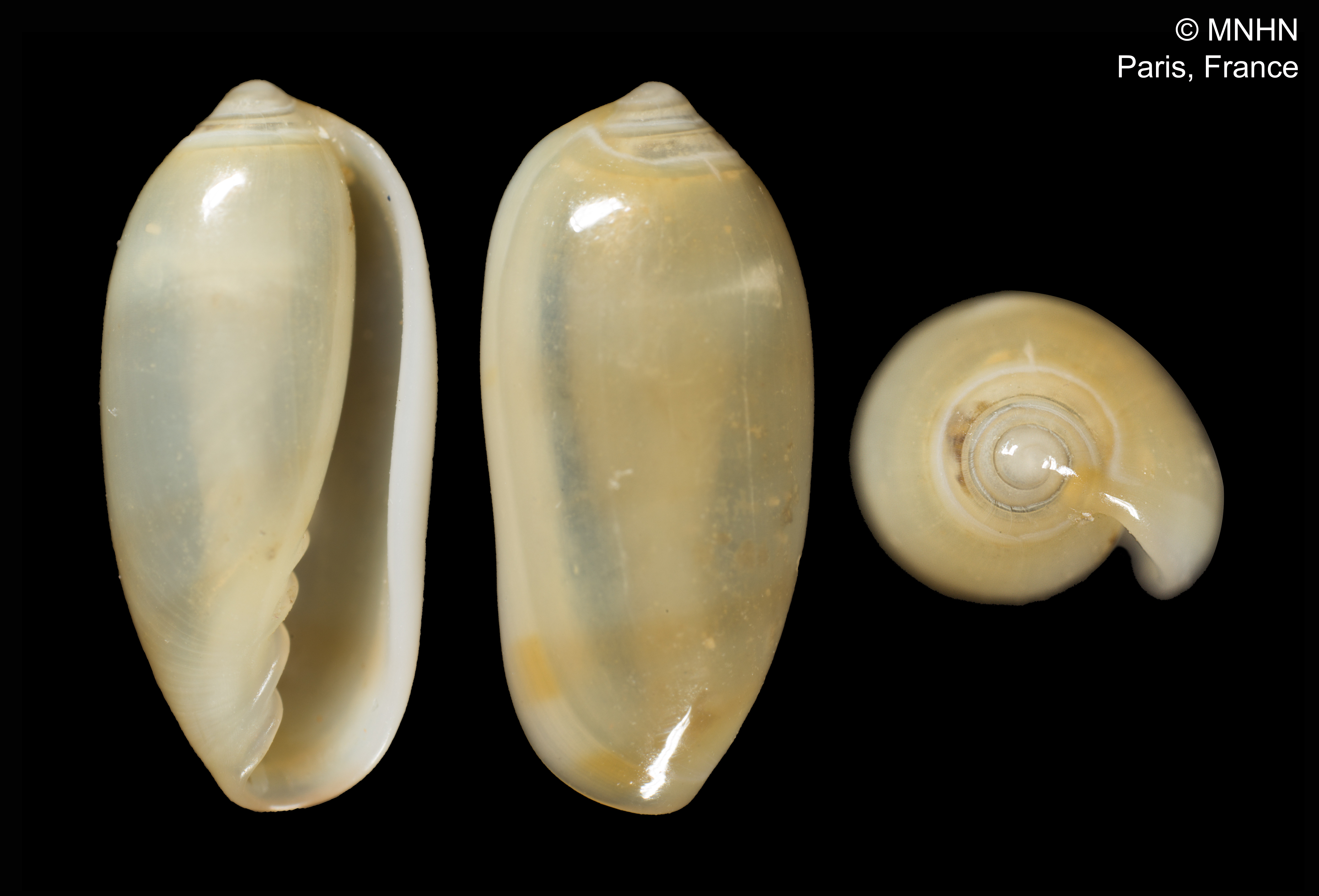
- Shell of Volvarina danielleae (holotype at MNHN, Paris)

Scientific classification
- Kingdom: Animalia
- Phylum: Mollusca
- Class: Gastropoda
- Subclass: Caenogastropoda
- Order: Neogastropoda
- Family: Marginellidae
- Subfamily: Marginellinae
- Genus: Volvarina
- Species: V. dirbergi

Binomial name
- Volvarina dirbergi Espinosa & Ortea, 2012

= Volvarina dirbergi =

Species of gastropod

Volvarina dirbergi is a species of sea snail, a marine gastropod mollusk in the family Marginellidae, of the margin snails.

== Description ==
The length of the shell ranges between 5.68mm and 7.4mm. Its diameter is between 2mm and 3.36mm. It is usually beige in colour.

== Distribution ==
This marine species was located at a depth of under 1 metre at Ile du Gosier, Guadeloupe, in the Caribbean Sea.
