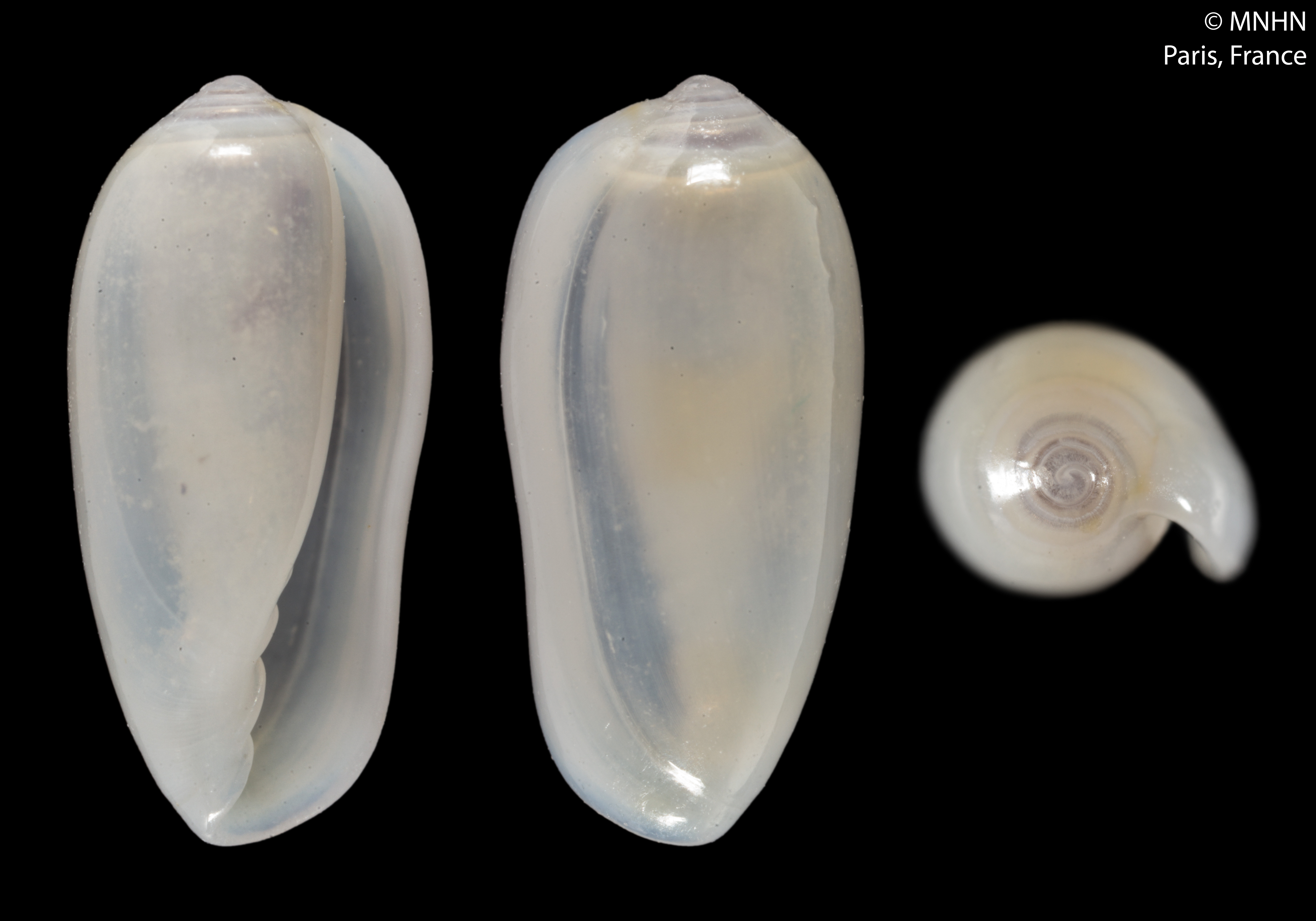
- Shell of Volvarina falusiae (holotype in the MNHN, Paris)

Scientific classification
- Kingdom: Animalia
- Phylum: Mollusca
- Class: Gastropoda
- Subclass: Caenogastropoda
- Order: Neogastropoda
- Family: Marginellidae
- Subfamily: Marginellinae
- Genus: Volvarina
- Species: V. falusiae

Binomial name
- Volvarina falusiae Ortea, 2014

Synonyms
- Volvarina (Duplivolva) falusiae Ortea, 2014 alternate representation

= Volvarina falusiae =

Species of gastropod

Volvarina falusiae is a species of sea snail, a marine gastropod mollusk in the family Marginellidae, the margin snails.

== Description ==
The length of the shell attains 7.24 mm, its diameter 3.21 mm.

== Distribution ==
This marine species occurs off Guadeloupe in the Caribbean Sea.
