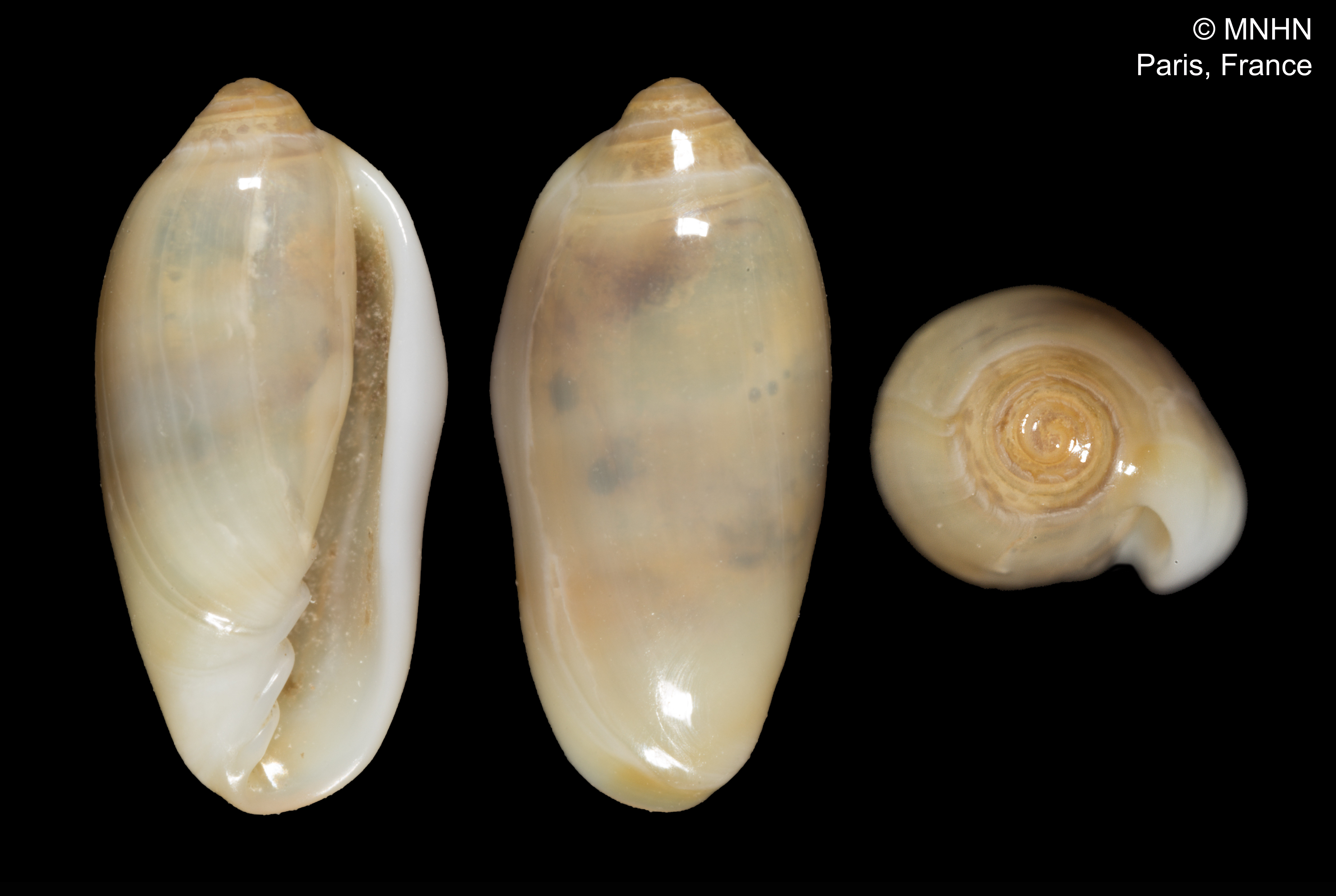
- Shell of Volvarina boucheti (holotype at MNHN, Paris)

Scientific classification
- Kingdom: Animalia
- Phylum: Mollusca
- Class: Gastropoda
- Subclass: Caenogastropoda
- Order: Neogastropoda
- Family: Marginellidae
- Subfamily: Marginellinae
- Genus: Volvarina
- Species: V. boucheti

Binomial name
- Volvarina boucheti Espinosa & Ortea, 2012

Synonyms
- Volvarina (Remivolva) boucheti Espinosa & Ortea, 2012 · alternate representation

= Volvarina boucheti =

Species of gastropod

Volvarina boucheti is a species of sea snail, a marine gastropod mollusk in the family Marginellidae, the margin snails.

== Description ==
The length of the shell attains 7.52 mm, its diameter 3.53 mm.

== Distribution ==
This marine species occurs off Guadeloupe in the Caribbean Sea.
