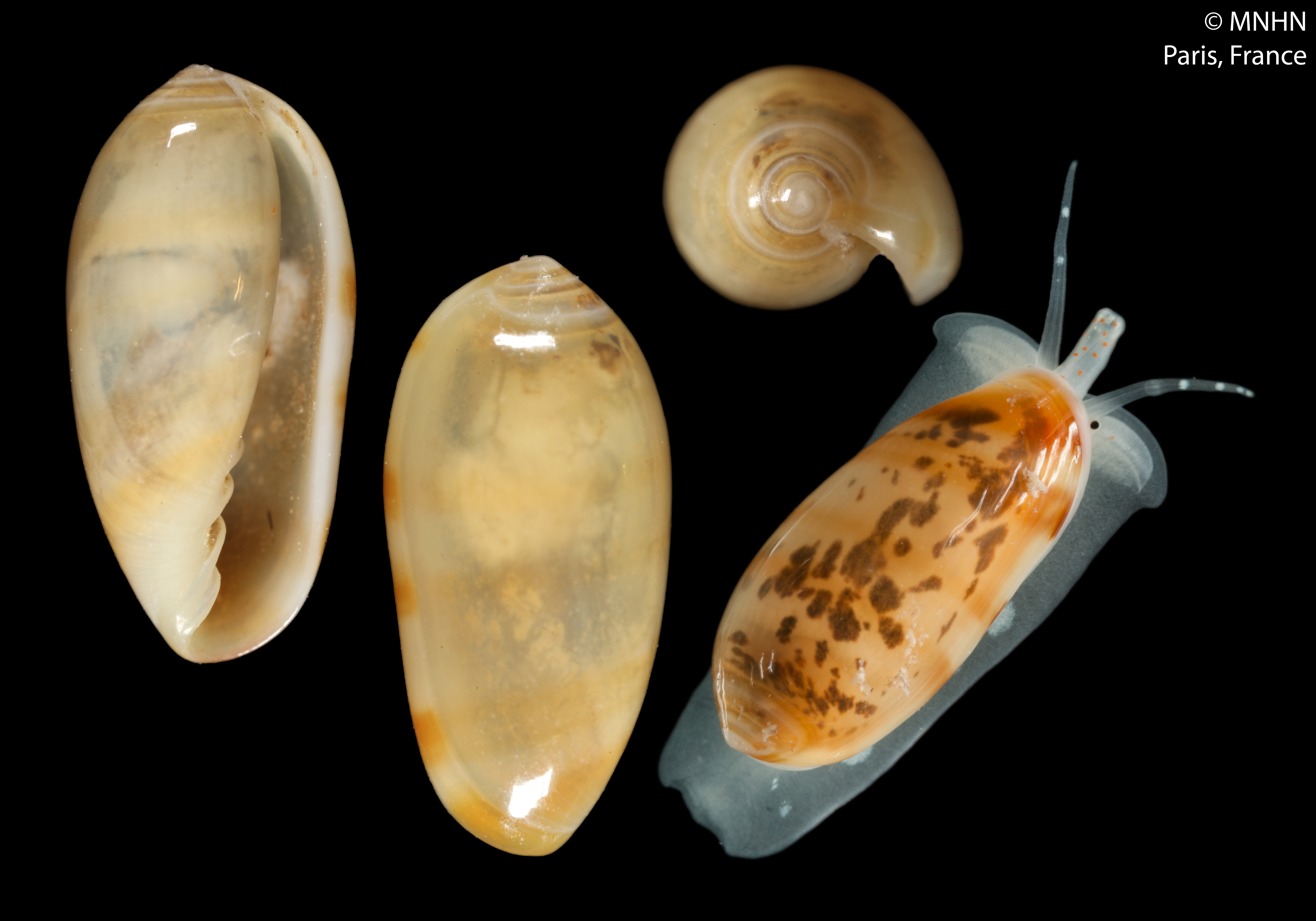
- Shell and animal of Volvarina virginieae (holotype at MNHN, Paris)

Scientific classification
- Kingdom: Animalia
- Phylum: Mollusca
- Class: Gastropoda
- Subclass: Caenogastropoda
- Order: Neogastropoda
- Family: Marginellidae
- Subfamily: Marginellinae
- Genus: Volvarina
- Species: V. virginieae

Binomial name
- Volvarina virginieae Espinosa & Ortea, 2012

= Volvarina virginieae =

Species of gastropod

Volvarina virginieae is a species of sea snail, a marine gastropod mollusk in the family Marginellidae, the margin snails.

== Description ==
The species typically acquires a shell with a length of 7.5 mm and a diameter of 3.56 mm.

== Distribution ==
This marine species occurs off Guadeloupe in the Caribbean Sea.
