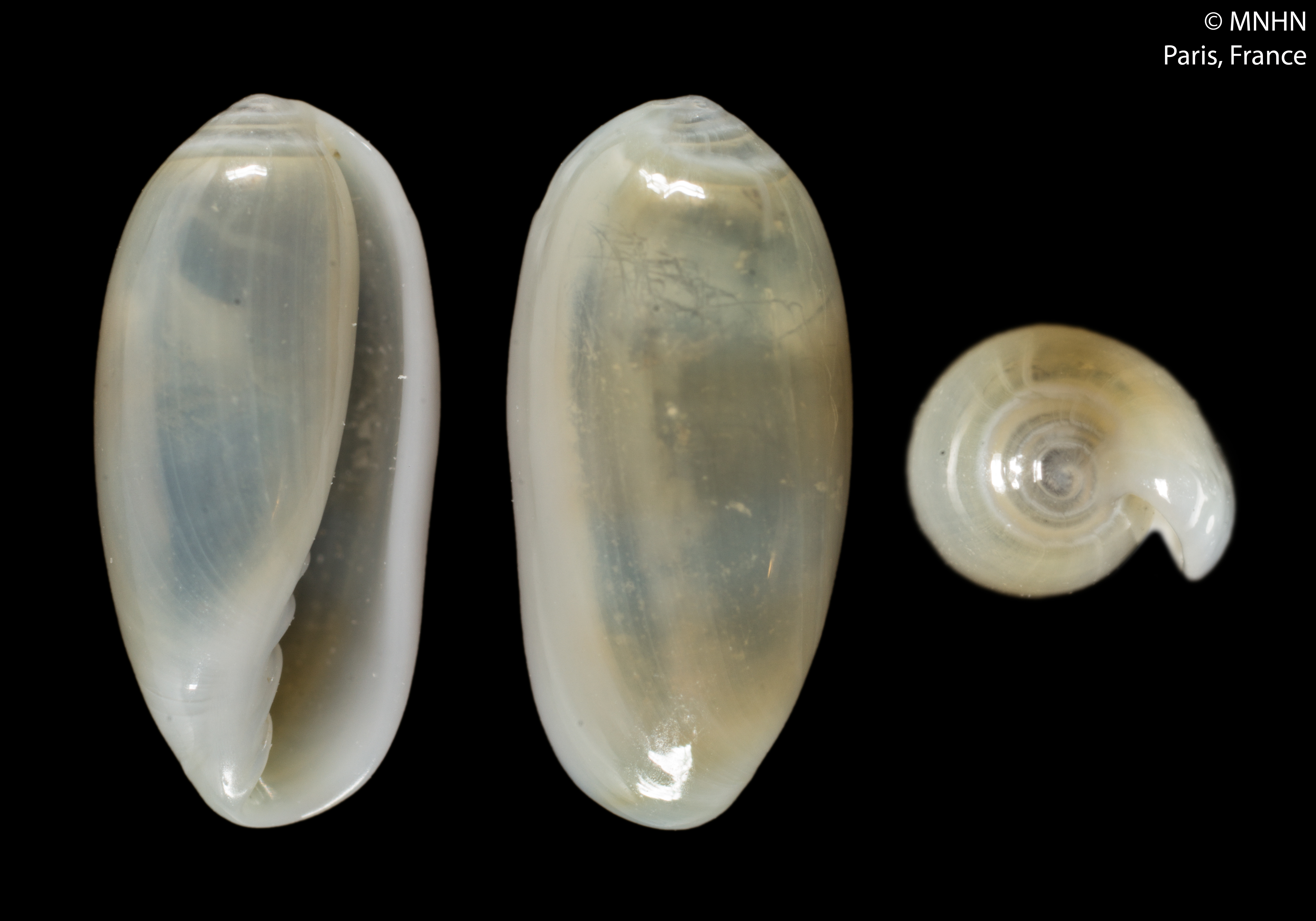
- Shell of Volvarina barbuyae (holotype in the MNHN, Paris)

Scientific classification
- Kingdom: Animalia
- Phylum: Mollusca
- Class: Gastropoda
- Subclass: Caenogastropoda
- Order: Neogastropoda
- Family: Marginellidae
- Subfamily: Marginellinae
- Genus: Volvarina
- Species: V. barbuyae

Binomial name
- Volvarina barbuyae Ortea, 2014

= Volvarina barbuyae =

Species of gastropod

Volvarina barbuyae is a species of sea snail, a marine gastropod mollusk in the family Marginellidae, the margin snails.

== Description ==
The length of the shell attains 7.41 mm, its diameter 3.38 mm.

== Distribution ==
This marine species occurs off Guadeloupe in the Caribbean Sea.
