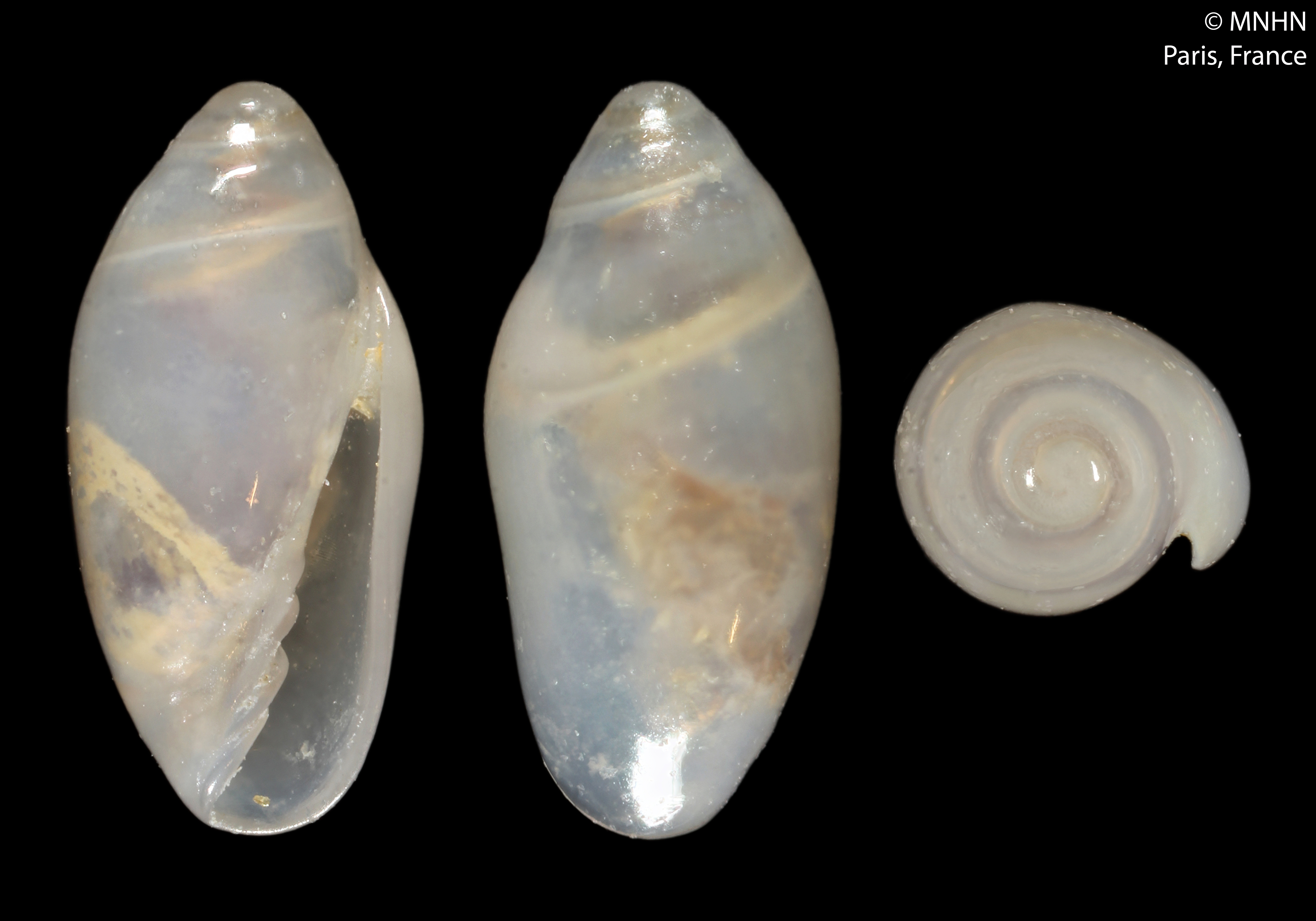
- Shell of Volvarina shlegeli (holotype at MNHN, Paris)

Scientific classification
- Kingdom: Animalia
- Phylum: Mollusca
- Class: Gastropoda
- Subclass: Caenogastropoda
- Order: Neogastropoda
- Family: Marginellidae
- Subfamily: Marginellinae
- Genus: Volvarina
- Species: V. shlegeli

Binomial name
- Volvarina shlegeli Bozzetti, 2017

= Volvarina shlegeli =

Species of gastropod

Volvarina shlegeli is a species of sea snail, a marine gastropod mollusk in the family Marginellidae, the margin snails.

== Description ==
The length of the shell attains 3.2 mm.

== Distribution ==
Thismarine species occurs off the Philippines.
