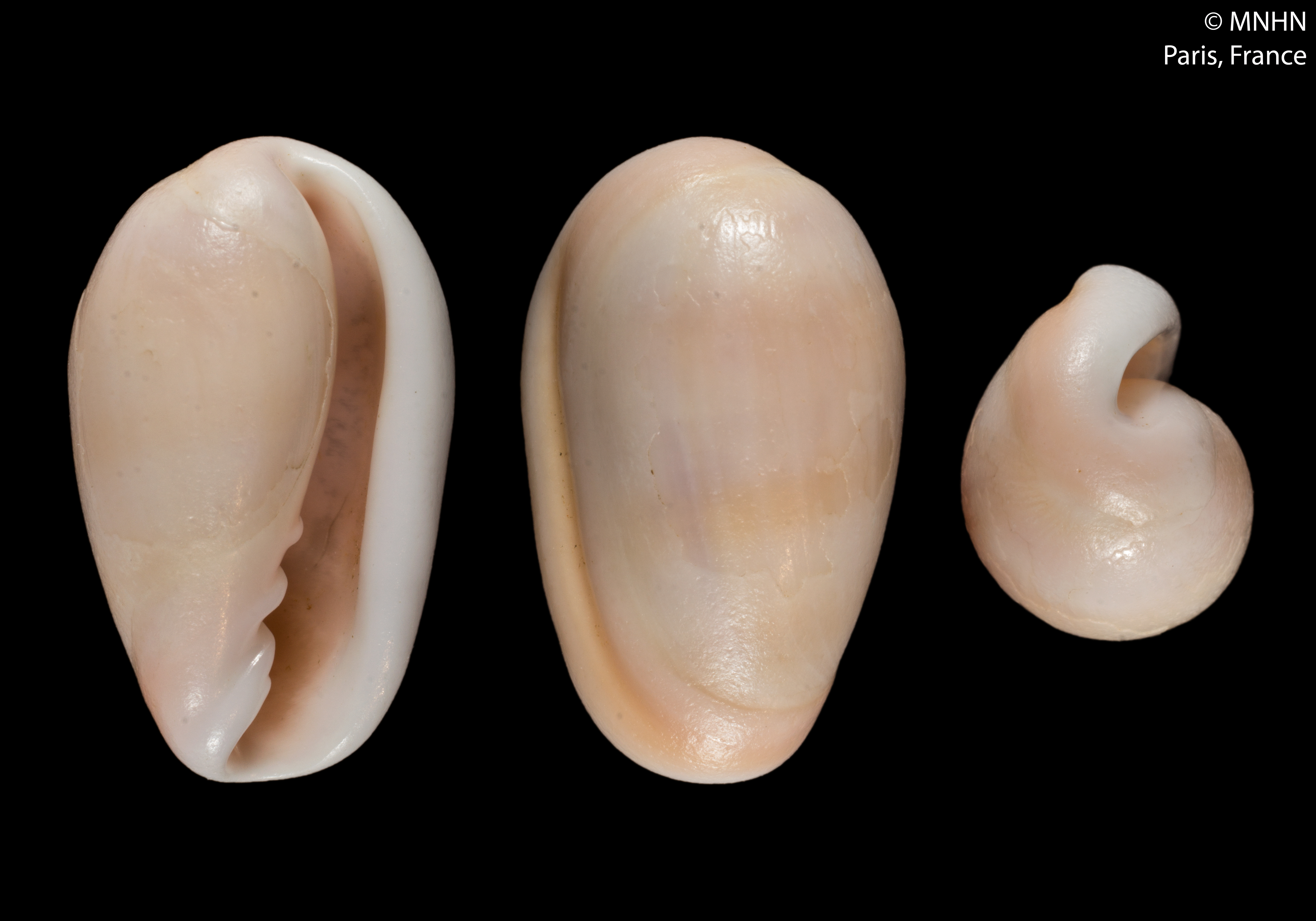
- Shell of Volvarina bifurcata (holotype at MNHN, Paris)

Scientific classification
- Kingdom: Animalia
- Phylum: Mollusca
- Class: Gastropoda
- Subclass: Caenogastropoda
- Order: Neogastropoda
- Family: Marginellidae
- Subfamily: Marginellinae
- Genus: Volvarina
- Species: V. bifurcata

Binomial name
- Volvarina bifurcata Boyer, 2015

= Volvarina bifurcata =

Species of gastropod

Volvarina bifurcata is a species of sea snail, a marine gastropod mollusk in the family Marginellidae, the margin snails.

== Distribution ==
This marine species occurs off Sri Lanka.
