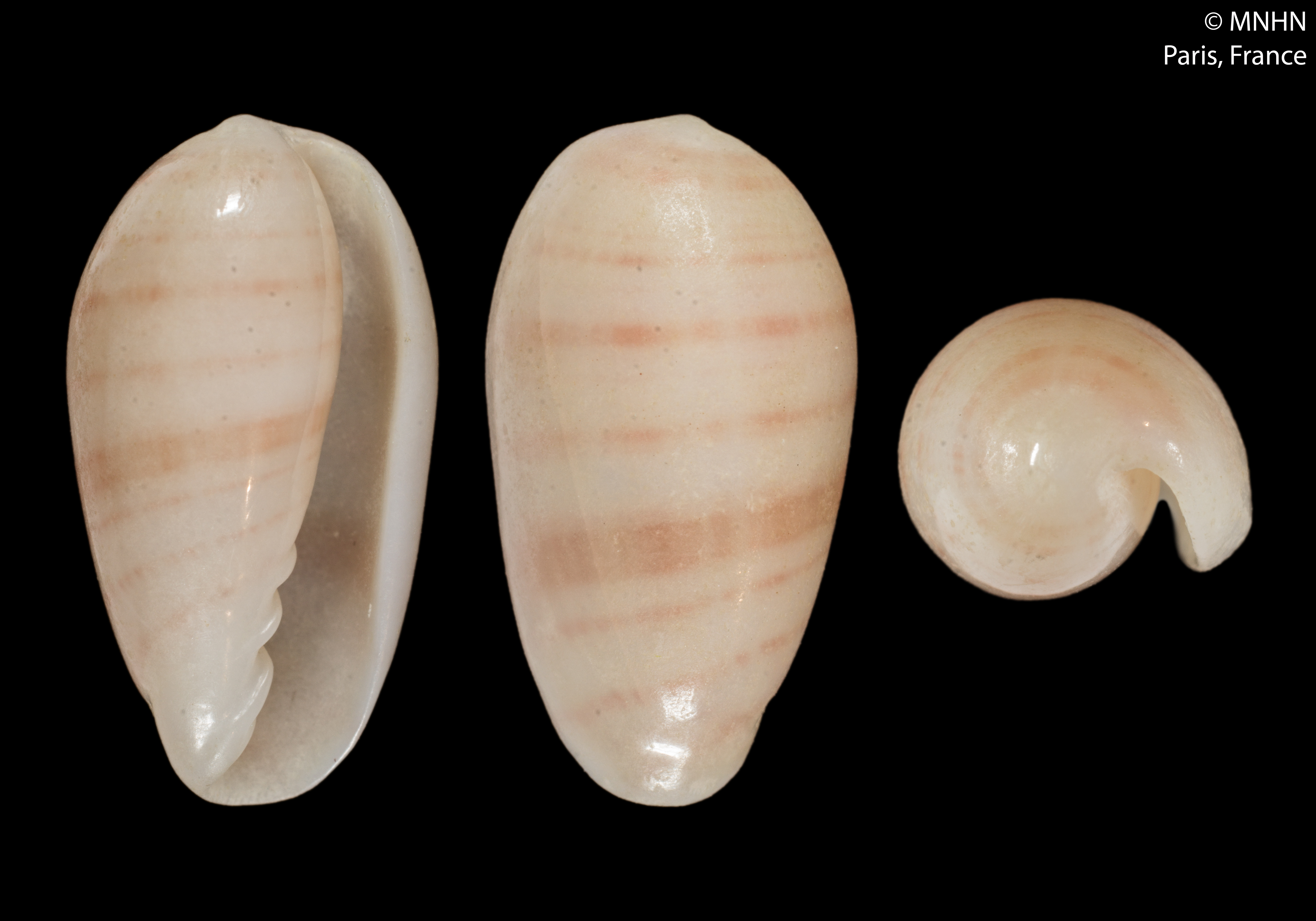
- Shell of Volvarina somwangi (holotype at MNHN, Paris)

Scientific classification
- Kingdom: Animalia
- Phylum: Mollusca
- Class: Gastropoda
- Subclass: Caenogastropoda
- Order: Neogastropoda
- Family: Marginellidae
- Subfamily: Marginellinae
- Genus: Volvarina
- Species: V. somwangi

Binomial name
- Volvarina somwangi Boyer, 2015

= Volvarina somwangi =

Species of gastropod

Volvarina somwangi is a species of sea snail, a marine gastropod mollusc in the family Marginellidae, the margin snails.

== Distribution ==
This marine species occurs off Phuket , Thailand
