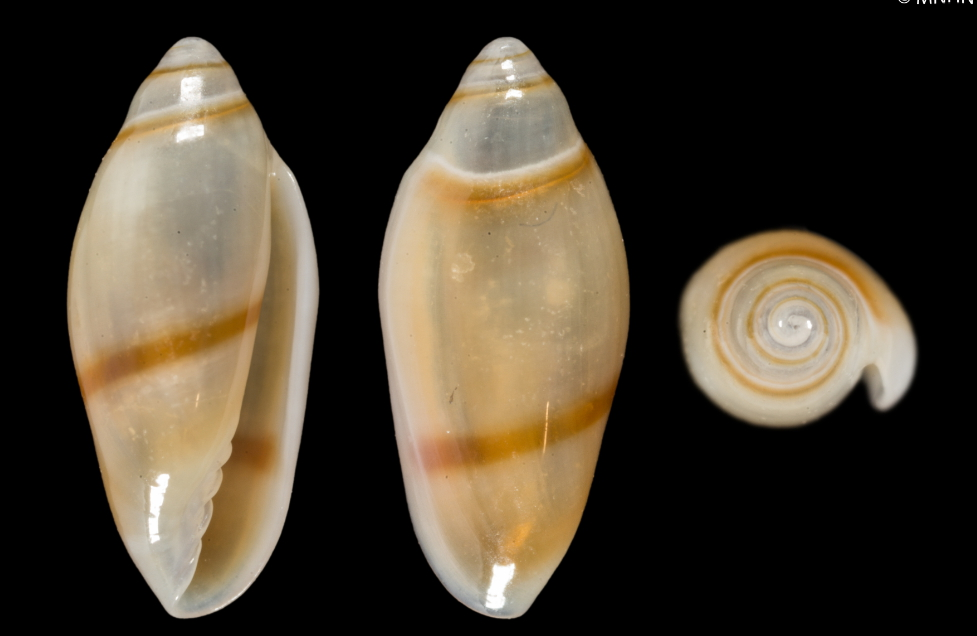
- Shell of Volvarina mizrahiae (holotype in the MNHN, Paris)

Scientific classification
- Kingdom: Animalia
- Phylum: Mollusca
- Class: Gastropoda
- Subclass: Caenogastropoda
- Order: Neogastropoda
- Family: Marginellidae
- Subfamily: Marginellinae
- Genus: Volvarina
- Species: V. mizrahiae

Binomial name
- Volvarina mizrahiae Ortea, 2014

= Volvarina mizrahiae =

Species of gastropod

Volvarina mizrahiae is a species of sea snail, a marine gastropod mollusk in the family Marginellidae, the margin snails.

== Description ==
The length of the shell attains 5.29 mm, its diameter 2.1 mm.

== Distribution ==
This marine species occurs off Guadeloupe in the Caribbean Sea.
