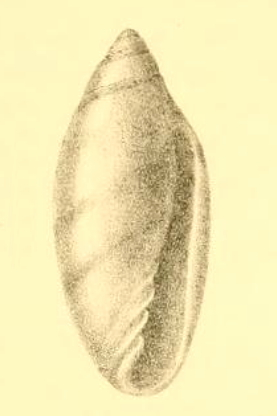
- Drawing of a shell of Volvarina eumorpha (holotype)

Scientific classification
- Kingdom: Animalia
- Phylum: Mollusca
- Class: Gastropoda
- Subclass: Caenogastropoda
- Order: Neogastropoda
- Family: Marginellidae
- Subfamily: Marginellinae
- Genus: Volvarina
- Species: V. eumorpha

Binomial name
- Volvarina eumorpha Espinosa, J. Martin & Ortea, 2018

Synonyms
- Marginella (Volvaria) eumorpha Melvill, 1906 (basionym)

= Volvarina eumorpha =

Species of gastropod

Volvarina eumorpha is a species of sea snail, a marine gastropod mollusk in the family Marginellidae, the margin snails.

== Description ==
The length of the shell attains 9 mm, its diameter 4 mm.

(Original description in Latin) The oblong-cylindrical shell is very shiny, smooth and polished. It is white or pale straw-brown, and almost transparent. The shell consists of five whorls, the apical ends of which are conical, the apex very large and completely smooth. The body whorl shows three dark spiral zones, alternated with reddish brown zones. The aperture is oblong. The outer lip is thickened, shiny and simple. The columella is oblique and four-plaited.

== Distribution ==
This small marine species occurs off the Gulf of Oman, Persian Gulf.
