= Volvarina southwicki =

Scientific classification
- Kingdom: Animalia
- Phylum: Mollusca
- Class: Gastropoda
- Subclass: Caenogastropoda
- Order: Neogastropoda
- Family: Marginellidae
- Subfamily: Marginellinae
- Genus: Volvarina
- Species: V. southwicki

Binomial name
- Volvarina southwicki Boyer, 2015(C. A. Davis, 1904)

Synonyms
- Marginella avena var. southwicki (C. A. Davis, 1904) (original combination); Marginella guttula Reeve, 1865; Volvaria avena var. southwicki C. A. Davis, 1904 (original combination); Volvarina guttula (Reeve, 1865) ·

Species of gastropod

Volvarina southwicki, common name the little drop marginella, is a species of sea snail, a marine gastropod mollusk in the family Marginellidae, the margin snails.

== Description ==
(Described as Marginella guttula) The shell is oblong-cylindrical, transparent and glassy. It is faintly three-banded with orange-brown. The spire is small. The outer lip is flexuous. The columellar region is four-plaited.

This is a bright, glassy shell, encircled with three very faint but well-defined bands of orange-brown.

== Distribution ==
This marine species occurs in the Atlantic Ocean off Bermuda.
