= Volvarina alloginella =

Scientific classification
- Kingdom: Animalia
- Phylum: Mollusca
- Class: Gastropoda
- Subclass: Caenogastropoda
- Order: Neogastropoda
- Family: Marginellidae
- Subfamily: Marginellinae
- Genus: Volvarina
- Species: V. alloginella

Binomial name
- Volvarina alloginella Espinosa, Moro & Ortea, 2011

Species of gastropod

Volvarina alloginella is a species of sea snail, a marine gastropod mollusk in the family Marginellidae, the margin snails.

== Description ==
The length of the shell attains 10.75 mm, its diameter 4.35 mm.

== Distribution ==
This marine species occurs off Cuba in the Caribbean Sea, more specifically, the species was found in Boca de Camarioca on the Hicacos Peninsula in the Matanzas province. Alloginella inhabits depths of 10 to 20 meters with many other species of Volvarina.
