= Volvarina lorenzoi =

Scientific classification
- Kingdom: Animalia
- Phylum: Mollusca
- Class: Gastropoda
- Subclass: Caenogastropoda
- Order: Neogastropoda
- Family: Marginellidae
- Subfamily: Marginellinae
- Genus: Volvarina
- Species: V. lorenzoi

Binomial name
- Volvarina lorenzoi Espinosa, Ortea & Pérez-Dionis, 2014

Species of gastropod

Volvarina lorenzoi is a species of sea snail, a marine gastropod mollusk in the family Marginellidae, the margin snails.

== Description ==
The length of the shell attains 11 mm, its diameter 5.1 mm.

== Distribution ==
This marine species occurs in the Atlantic Ocean off the Canary Islands.
