= Volvarina deningeri =

Scientific classification
- Kingdom: Animalia
- Phylum: Mollusca
- Class: Gastropoda
- Subclass: Caenogastropoda
- Order: Neogastropoda
- Family: Marginellidae
- Subfamily: Marginellinae
- Genus: Volvarina
- Species: †V. deningeri

Binomial name
- †Volvarina deningeri (P. J. Fischer, 1927)

Synonyms
- † Marginella (Volvarina) deningeri P. J. Fischer, 1927 ·

Species of gastropod

Volvarina deningeri is an extinct species of sea snail, a marine gastropod mollusk in the family Marginellidae, the margin snails.

== Distribution ==
Fossils of this marine species were found in Pliocene strata in Timor, Indonesia.
