= Volvarina pinero =

Scientific classification
- Kingdom: Animalia
- Phylum: Mollusca
- Class: Gastropoda
- Subclass: Caenogastropoda
- Order: Neogastropoda
- Family: Marginellidae
- Subfamily: Marginellinae
- Genus: Volvarina
- Species: V. pinero

Binomial name
- Volvarina pinero Espinosa, Soto [Vázquez] & Ortea, 2022

Species of gastropod

Volvarina pinero is a species of sea snail, a marine gastropod mollusk in the family Marginellidae, the margin snails.

== Description ==
The length of the shell attains 5.7 mm, its diameter is 2.5 mm.

== Distribution ==
This marine species occurs off Cuba in the Caribbean Sea.
