= Volvarina parvitica =

Scientific classification
- Kingdom: Animalia
- Phylum: Mollusca
- Class: Gastropoda
- Subclass: Caenogastropoda
- Order: Neogastropoda
- Family: Marginellidae
- Subfamily: Marginellinae
- Genus: Volvarina
- Species: V. parvitica

Binomial name
- Volvarina parvitica Espinosa, Ortea & Magaña, 2018

Species of gastropod

Volvarina parvitica is a species of sea snail, a marine gastropod mollusk in the family Marginellidae, the margin snails.

== Description ==
The length of the shell attains 7.25 mm, its diameter 3.1 mm.

== Distribution ==
This marine species occurs off Costa Rica, Caribbean Sea.
