= Volvarina ondina =

Scientific classification
- Kingdom: Animalia
- Phylum: Mollusca
- Class: Gastropoda
- Subclass: Caenogastropoda
- Order: Neogastropoda
- Family: Marginellidae
- Subfamily: Marginellinae
- Genus: Volvarina
- Species: V. ondina

Binomial name
- Volvarina ondina Espinosa, Moro & Ortea, 2011

Species of gastropod

Volvarina ondina is a species of sea snail, a marine gastropod mollusk in the family Marginellidae, the margin snails.

== Description ==
The length of the shell attains 7.3 mm, its diameter is 3.35 mm.

== Distribution ==
This marine species occurs off Cuba in the Caribbean Sea.
