= Volvarina columba =

Scientific classification
- Kingdom: Animalia
- Phylum: Mollusca
- Class: Gastropoda
- Subclass: Caenogastropoda
- Order: Neogastropoda
- Family: Marginellidae
- Subfamily: Marginellinae
- Genus: Volvarina
- Species: V. columba

Binomial name
- Volvarina columba Espinosa, Moro & Ortea, 2011

Species of gastropod

Volvarina columba is a species of sea snail, a marine gastropod mollusk in the family Marginellidae, the margin snails.

== Description ==
The length of the shell attains 5.5 mm, its diameter 2.3 mm.

== Distribution ==
This marine species occurs off Cuba in the Caribbean Sea.
