= Volvarina damasoi =

Scientific classification
- Kingdom: Animalia
- Phylum: Mollusca
- Class: Gastropoda
- Subclass: Caenogastropoda
- Order: Neogastropoda
- Family: Marginellidae
- Subfamily: Marginellinae
- Genus: Volvarina
- Species: V. damasoi

Binomial name
- Volvarina damasoi T. Cossignani, 2017

Species of gastropod

Volvarina damasoi is a species of sea snail, a marine gastropod mollusk in the family Marginellidae, the margin snails.

== Description ==
The length of the shell attains 7.1 mm.

== Distribution ==
This marine species occurs in the Atlantic Ocean off Brazil.
