= Volvarina pontesi =

Scientific classification
- Kingdom: Animalia
- Phylum: Mollusca
- Class: Gastropoda
- Subclass: Caenogastropoda
- Order: Neogastropoda
- Family: Marginellidae
- Subfamily: Marginellinae
- Genus: Volvarina
- Species: V. pontesi

Binomial name
- Volvarina pontesi Rios & Leal, 1993

Species of gastropod

Volvarina pontesi is a species of sea snail, a marine gastropod mollusk in the family Marginellidae, the margin snails.

== Description ==
The length of the shell attains 13.8 mm.

== Distribution ==
This marine species occurs off the Brazil.
