= Gibberula ocellus =

Scientific classification
- Kingdom: Animalia
- Phylum: Mollusca
- Class: Gastropoda
- Subclass: Caenogastropoda
- Order: Neogastropoda
- Family: Cystiscidae
- Subfamily: Cystiscinae
- Genus: Gibberula
- Species: G. ocellus

Binomial name
- Gibberula ocellus (Dall, 1927)

Species of gastropod

Gibberula ocellus is a species of sea snail, a marine gastropod mollusk, in the family Cystiscidae.
