= Gibberula poppei =

Scientific classification
- Kingdom: Animalia
- Phylum: Mollusca
- Class: Gastropoda
- Subclass: Caenogastropoda
- Order: Neogastropoda
- Family: Cystiscidae
- Subfamily: Cystiscinae
- Genus: Gibberula
- Species: G. poppei

Binomial name
- Gibberula poppei Cossignani, 2001

Species of gastropod

Gibberula poppei is a species of very small sea snail, a marine gastropod mollusk or micromollusk in the family Cystiscidae.
