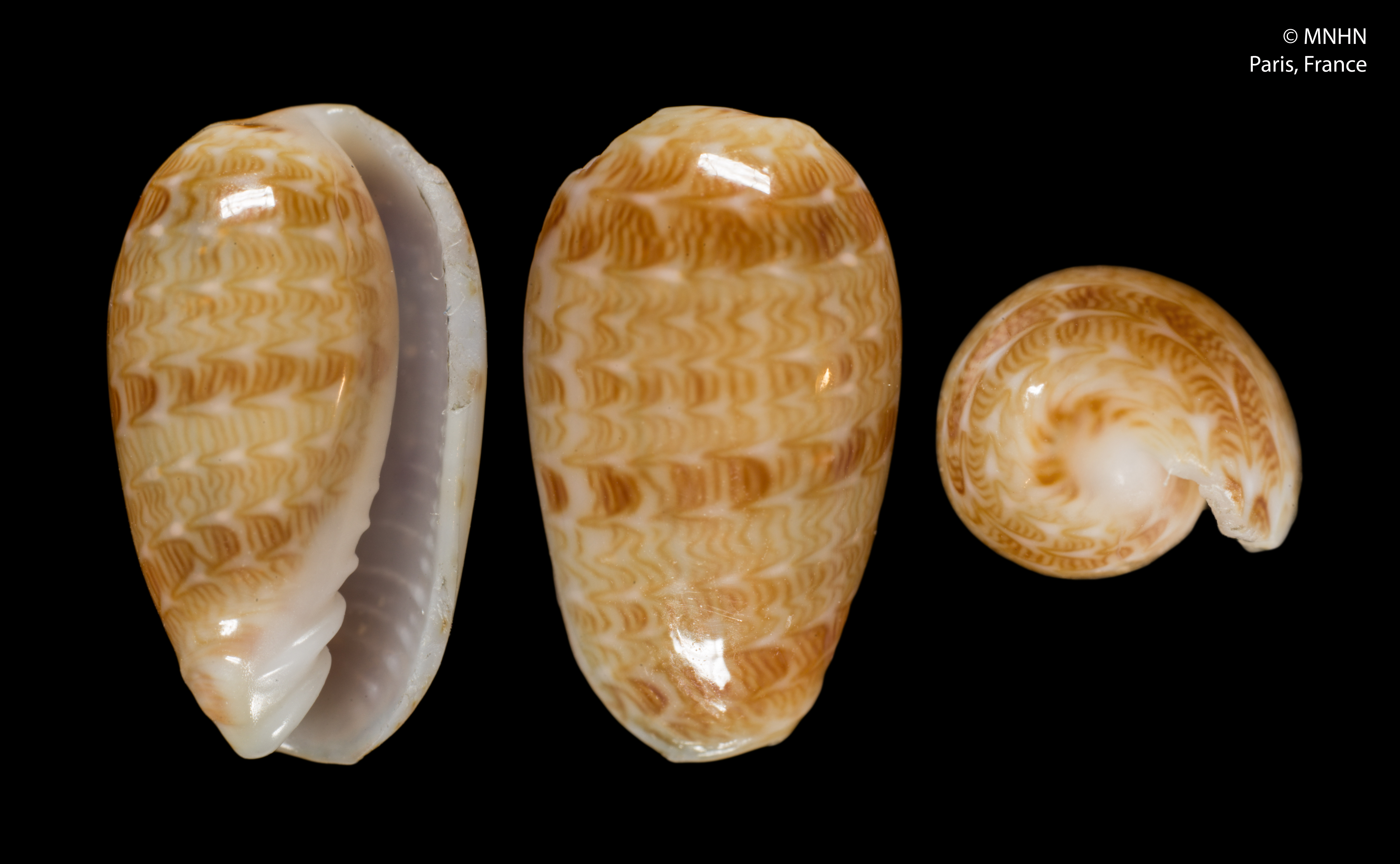
- Shell of Gibberula moscatellii (holotype at MNHN, Paris)

Scientific classification
- Kingdom: Animalia
- Phylum: Mollusca
- Class: Gastropoda
- Subclass: Caenogastropoda
- Order: Neogastropoda
- Family: Cystiscidae
- Subfamily: Cystiscinae
- Genus: Gibberula
- Species: G. moscatellii

Binomial name
- Gibberula moscatellii Boyer, 2004

= Gibberula moscatellii =

Species of gastropod

Gibberula moscatellii is a species of very small sea snail, a marine gastropod mollusk or micromollusk in the family Cystiscidae.

== Distribution ==
This species occurs in the Atlantic Ocean off Bahia, Brazil.
