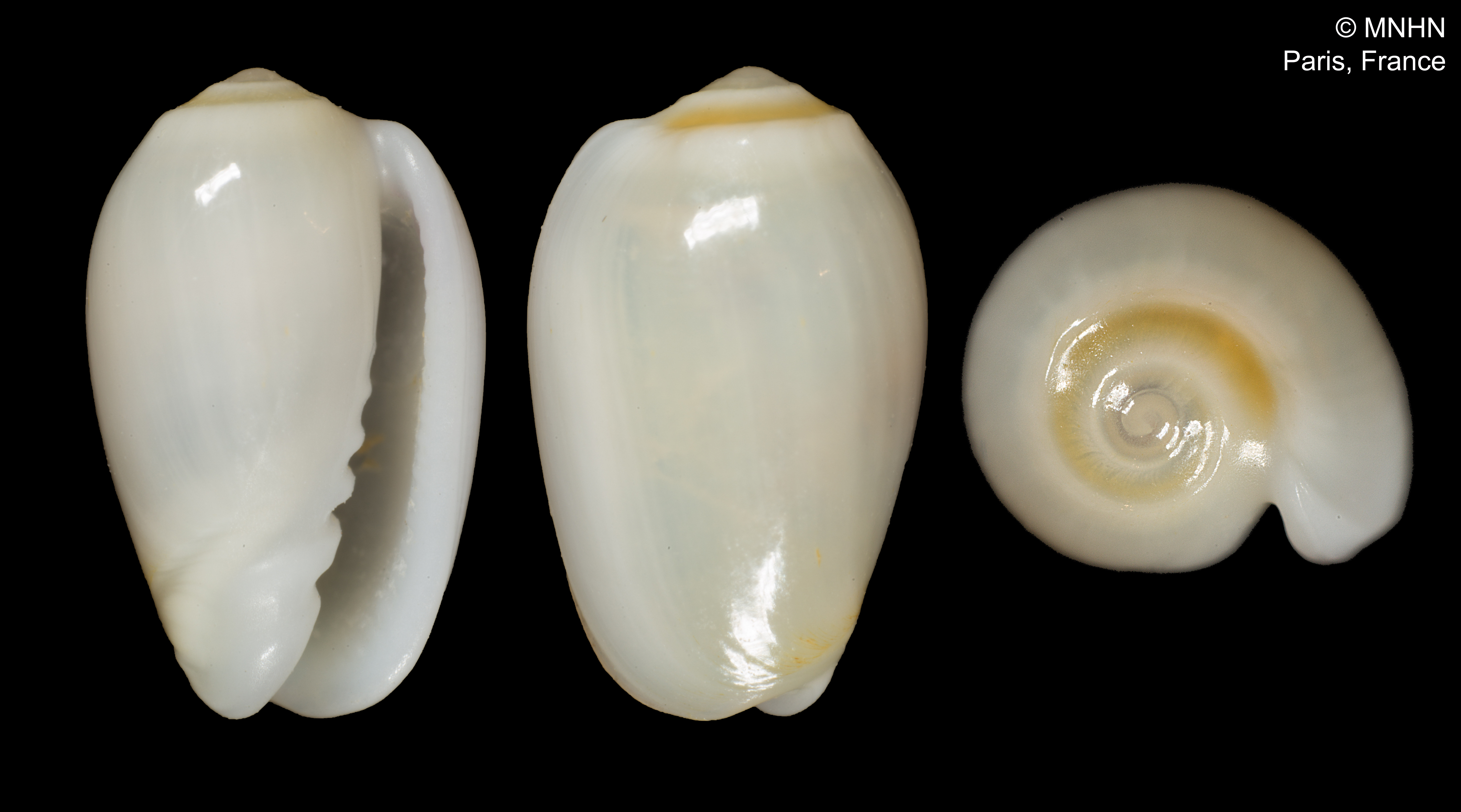

Scientific classification
- Kingdom: Animalia
- Phylum: Mollusca
- Class: Gastropoda
- Subclass: Caenogastropoda
- Order: Neogastropoda
- Family: Cystiscidae
- Subfamily: Cystiscinae
- Genus: Gibberula
- Species: G. cristata

Binomial name
- Gibberula cristata Gofas, 1989

= Gibberula cristata =

Species of gastropod

Gibberula cristata is a species of sea snail, a marine gastropod mollusk, in the family Cystiscidae.

== Distribution ==
This marine species occurs off Angola.
