= Gibberula gironai =

Scientific classification
- Kingdom: Animalia
- Phylum: Mollusca
- Class: Gastropoda
- Subclass: Caenogastropoda
- Order: Neogastropoda
- Family: Cystiscidae
- Subfamily: Cystiscinae
- Genus: Gibberula
- Species: G. gironai

Binomial name
- Gibberula gironai Espinosa & Ortea, 2007

Species of gastropod

Gibberula gironai is a species of very small sea snail, a marine gastropod mollusk or micromollusk in the family Cystiscidae.

== Description ==
Males can reach a maximum length of 0.2 cm

== Distribution ==
This species can be found in the Western Atlantic.
