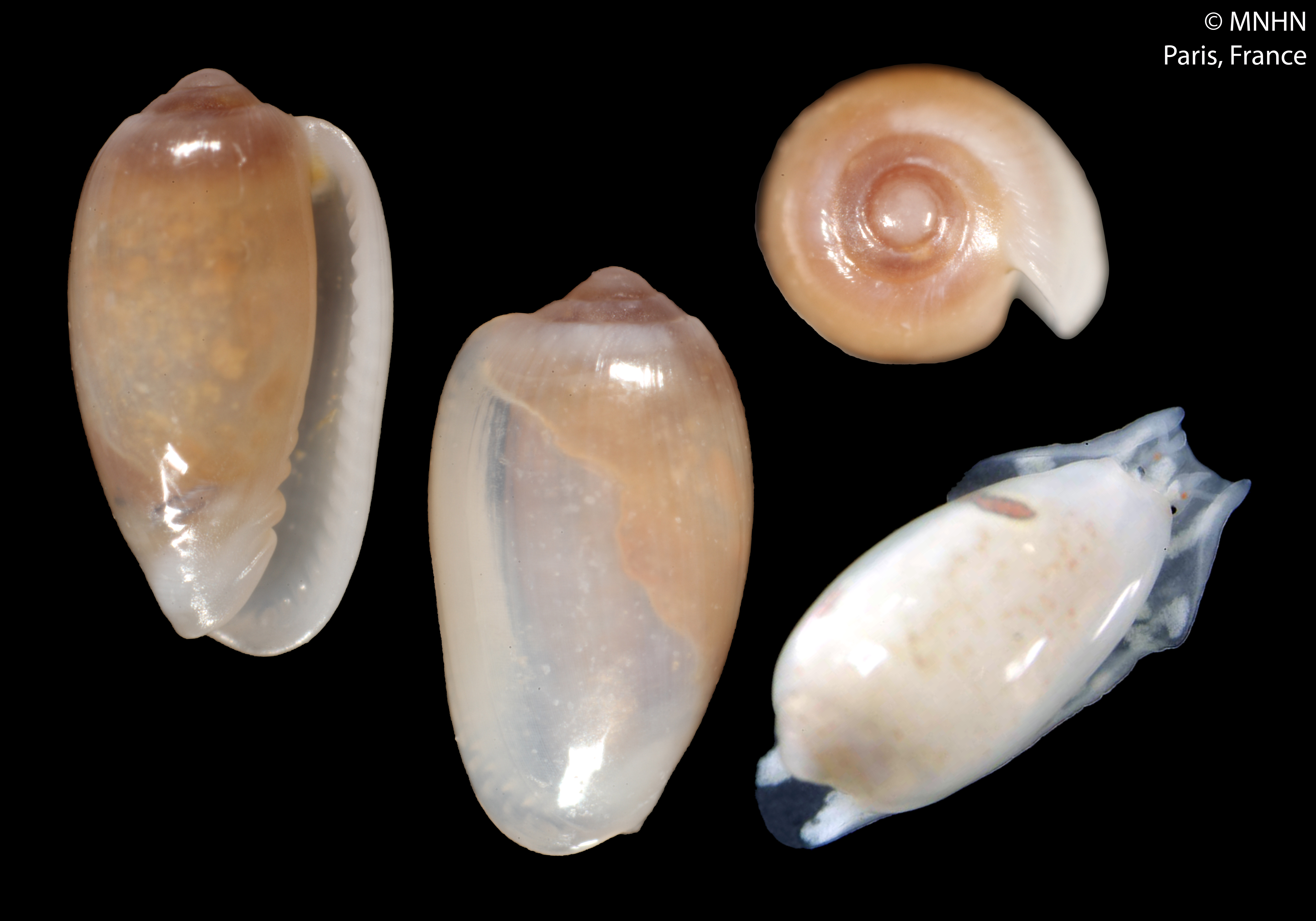
- Shell of Gibberula arubagrandis (holotype at MNHN, Paris)

Scientific classification
- Kingdom: Animalia
- Phylum: Mollusca
- Class: Gastropoda
- Subclass: Caenogastropoda
- Order: Neogastropoda
- Family: Cystiscidae
- Subfamily: Cystiscinae
- Genus: Gibberula
- Species: G. arubagrandis

Binomial name
- Gibberula arubagrandis McCleery, 2008

= Gibberula arubagrandis =

Species of gastropod

Gibberula arubagrandis is a species of very small sea snail, a marine gastropod mollusc or micromollusc in the family Cystiscidae.

== Description ==
The length of the shell attains 3.31 mm.

== Distribution ==
This species occurs in the Caribbean Sea off Aruba.
