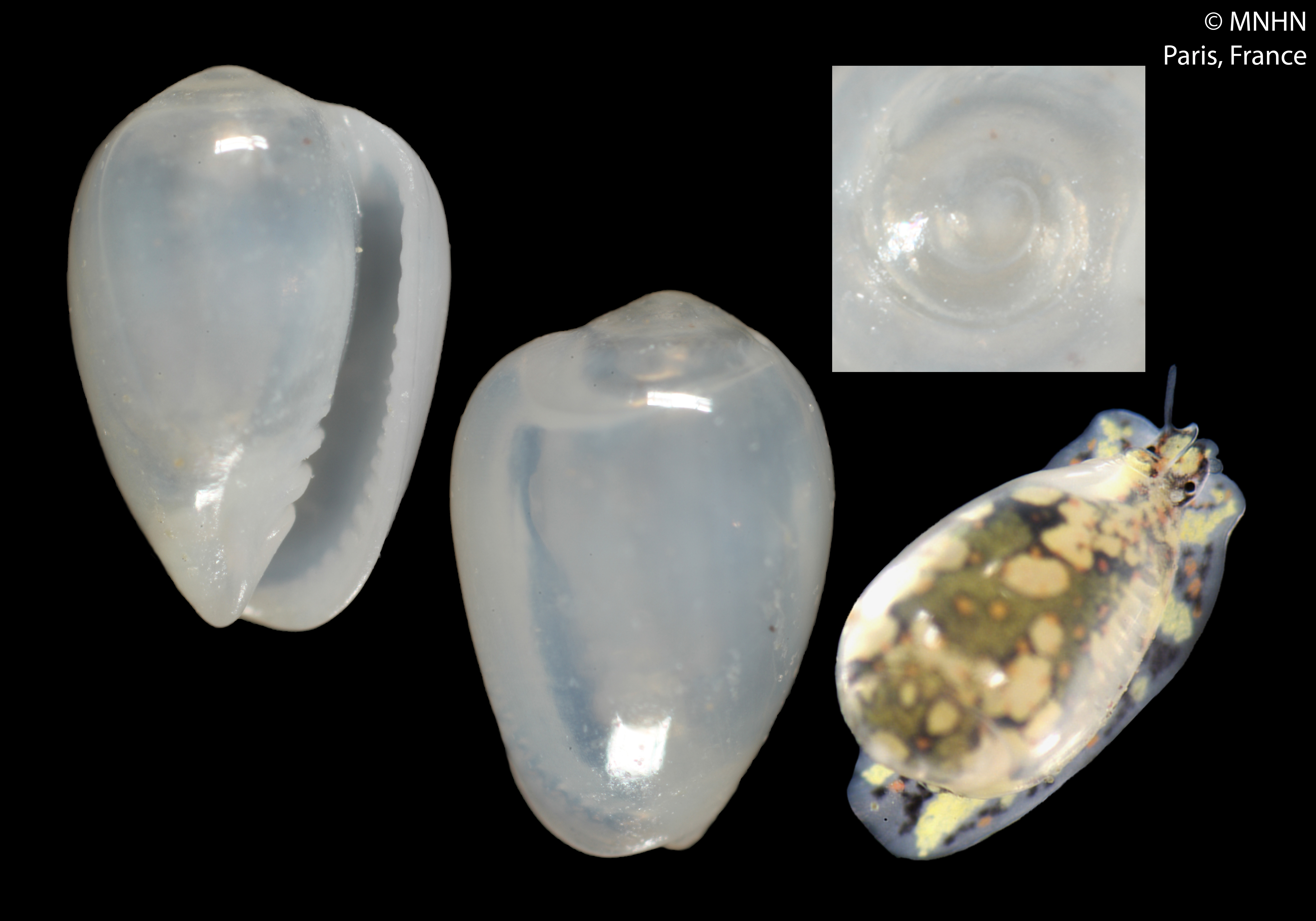
- Shell of Gibberula jenphillipsi (holotype at MNHN, Paris)

Scientific classification
- Kingdom: Animalia
- Phylum: Mollusca
- Class: Gastropoda
- Subclass: Caenogastropoda
- Order: Neogastropoda
- Family: Cystiscidae
- Subfamily: Cystiscinae
- Genus: Gibberula
- Species: G. jenphillipsi

Binomial name
- Gibberula jenphillipsi McCleery, 2008

= Gibberula jenphillipsi =

Species of gastropod

Gibberula jenphillipsi is a species of very small sea snail, a marine gastropod mollusc or micromollusc in the family Cystiscidae.

== Description ==
The length of the shell attains 2.43 mm.

== Distribution ==
This species occurs in the Caribbean Sea off Curaçao.
