= Gibberula ventricosa =

Scientific classification
- Kingdom: Animalia
- Phylum: Mollusca
- Class: Gastropoda
- Subclass: Caenogastropoda
- Order: Neogastropoda
- Family: Cystiscidae
- Subfamily: Cystiscinae
- Genus: Gibberula
- Species: G. ventricosa

Binomial name
- Gibberula ventricosa Boyer, 2017

Species of gastropod

Gibberula ventricosa is a species of sea snail, a marine gastropod mollusk, in the family Cystiscidae.

== Distribution ==
This species occurs in Egyptian part of the Red Sea.
