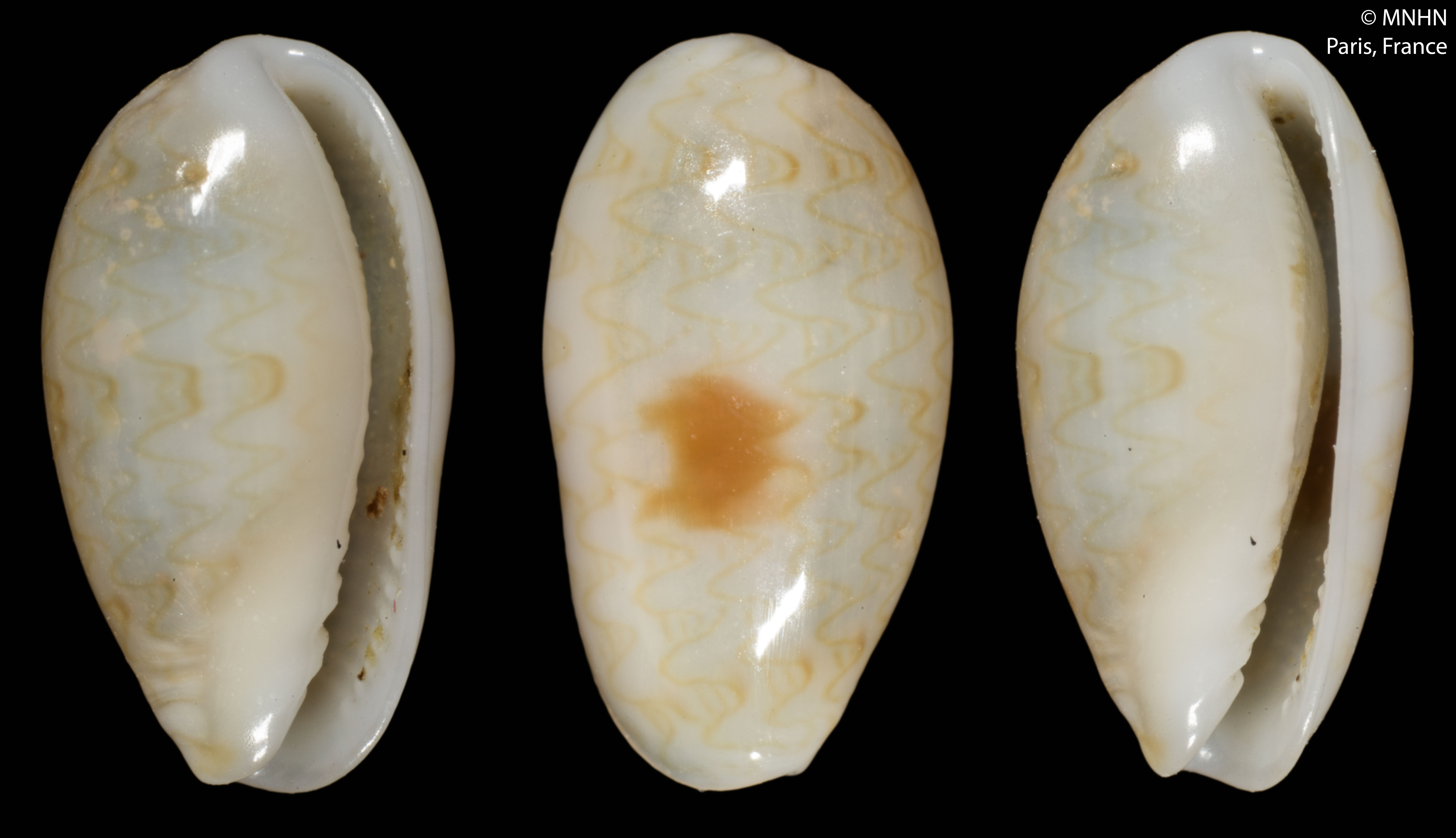

Scientific classification
- Kingdom: Animalia
- Phylum: Mollusca
- Class: Gastropoda
- Subclass: Caenogastropoda
- Order: Neogastropoda
- Family: Cystiscidae
- Subfamily: Cystiscinae
- Genus: Gibberula
- Species: G. gabryae

Binomial name
- Gibberula gabryae Bozzetti, 1993

= Gibberula gabryae =

Species of sea snail

Gibberula gabryae is a species of sea snail, a marine gastropod mollusk, in the family Cystiscidae.

== Distribution ==
This species occurs in the Indian Ocean off Somalia.
