= Gibberula judithae =

Scientific classification
- Kingdom: Animalia
- Phylum: Mollusca
- Class: Gastropoda
- Subclass: Caenogastropoda
- Order: Neogastropoda
- Family: Cystiscidae
- Subfamily: Cystiscinae
- Genus: Gibberula
- Species: G. judithae

Binomial name
- Gibberula judithae Ortea & Moro, 2017

Species of gastropod

Gibberula judithae is a species of marine gastropod in the family Cystiscidae. It is known from the Canary Islands.

== Distribution ==
This species occurs in the waters of the Canary Islands. The type specimens were obtained off Lanzarote from a depth of about 24 m (79 ft).

== Description ==
The shell is smooth and translucent and measures about 2.5 mm–2.7 mm × 1.7 mm–1.85 mm (0.098 in–0.106 in × 0.067 in–0.073 in).
