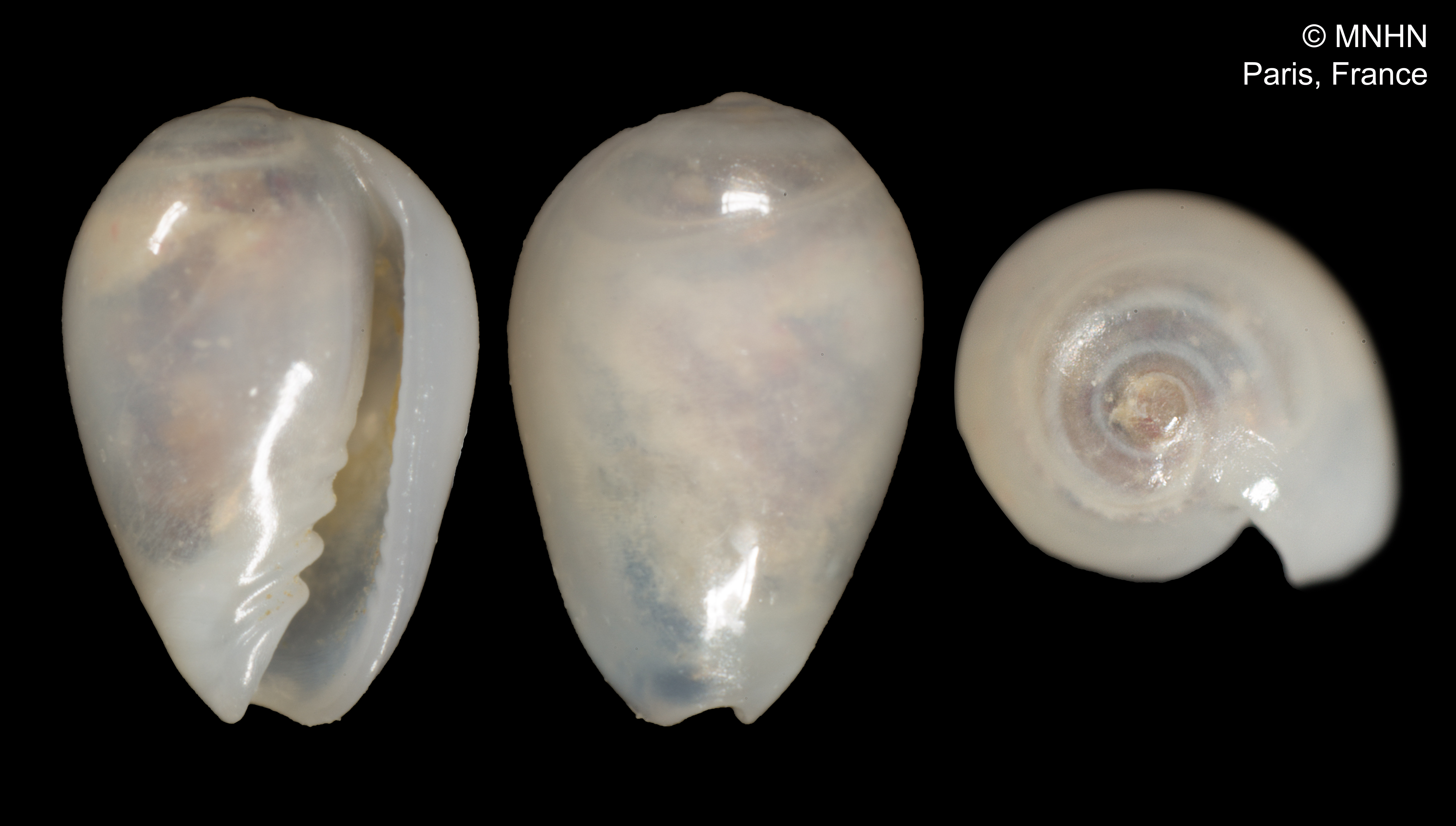

Scientific classification
- Kingdom: Animalia
- Phylum: Mollusca
- Class: Gastropoda
- Subclass: Caenogastropoda
- Order: Neogastropoda
- Family: Cystiscidae
- Subfamily: Cystiscinae
- Genus: Gibberula
- Species: G. diadema

Binomial name
- Gibberula diadema Pin & Boyer, 1995

= Gibberula diadema =

Species of gastropod

Gibberula diadema is a species of sea snail, a marine gastropod mollusk, in the family Cystiscidae.

== Description ==
The length of the shell attains 2.2 mm.

== Distribution ==
This marine species occurs off Senegal.
