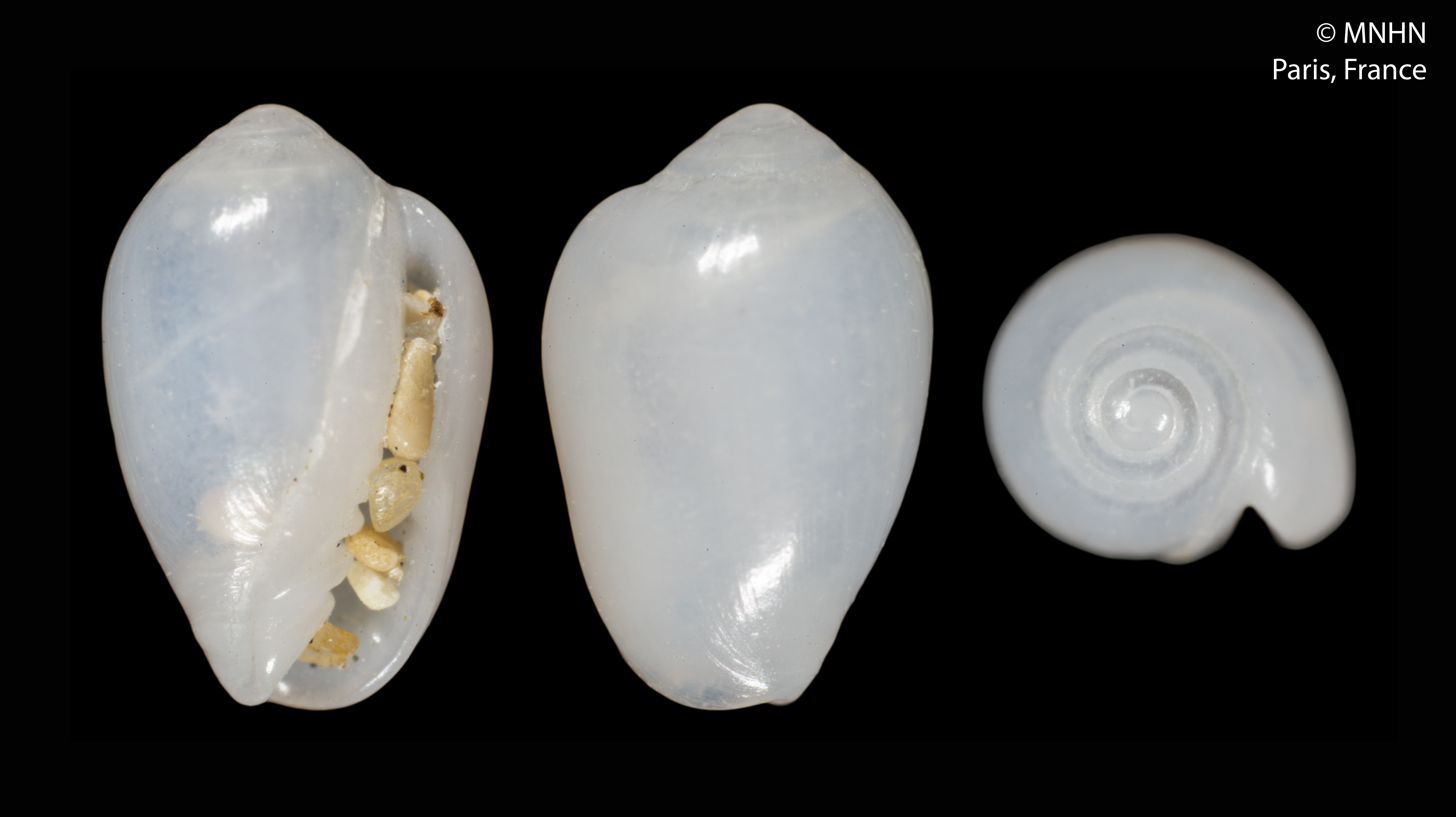
- Shell of Gibberula elisae (holotype at MNHN, Paris)

Scientific classification
- Kingdom: Animalia
- Phylum: Mollusca
- Class: Gastropoda
- Subclass: Caenogastropoda
- Order: Neogastropoda
- Family: Cystiscidae
- Genus: Gibberula
- Species: G. elisae

Binomial name
- Gibberula elisae Bozzetti & Cossignani, 2009

= Gibberula elisae =

Species of gastropod

Gibberula elisae is a species of very small sea snail, a marine gastropod mollusc or micromollusc in the family Cystiscidae.

== Description ==
The length of the shell attains 3.05 mm. It is smooth and white.

== Distribution ==
This marine species is primarily found near Madagascar.
