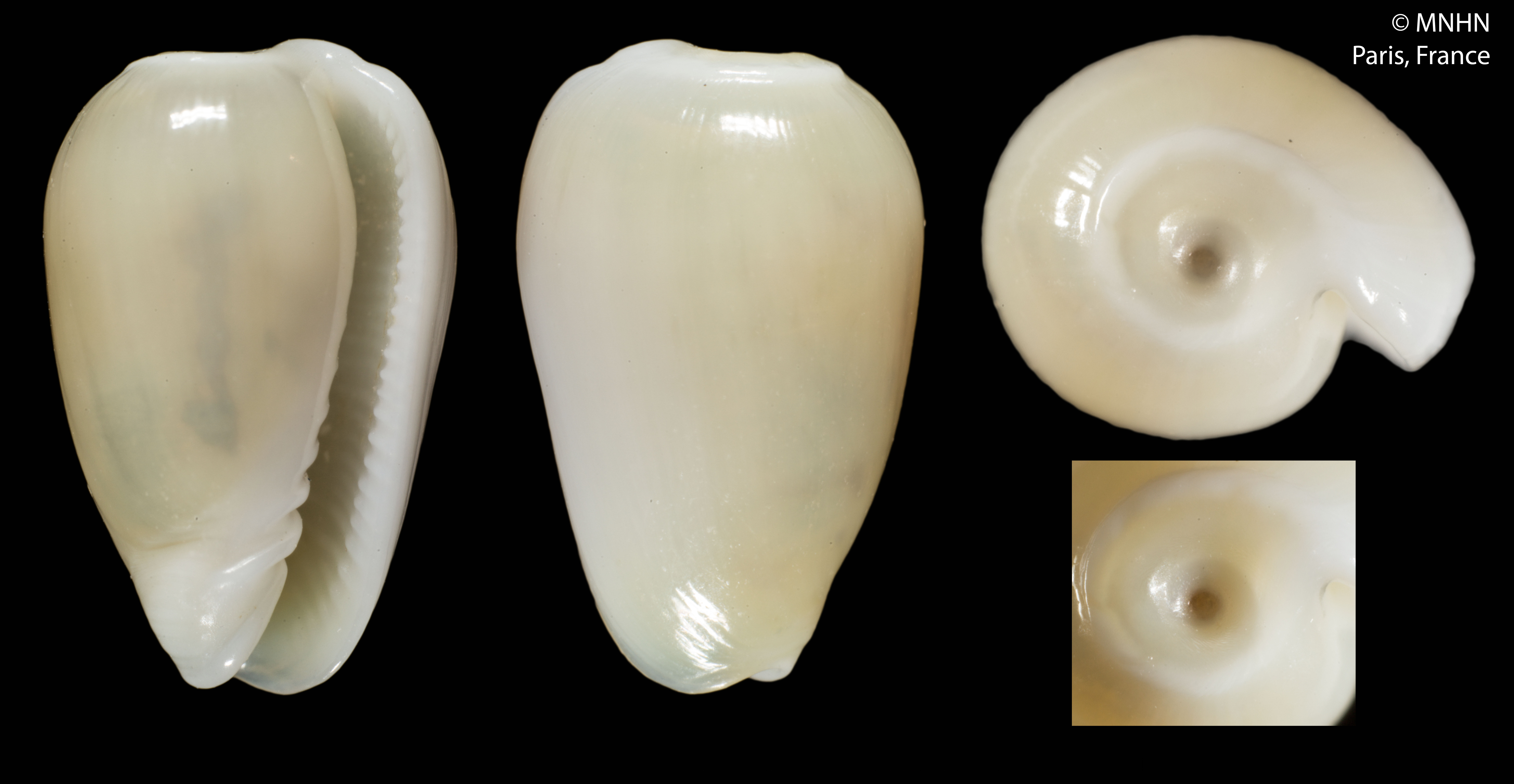
- Gibberula infundibulum

Scientific classification
- Kingdom: Animalia
- Phylum: Mollusca
- Class: Gastropoda
- Subclass: Caenogastropoda
- Order: Neogastropoda
- Family: Cystiscidae
- Subfamily: Cystiscinae
- Genus: Gibberula
- Species: G. infundibulum

Binomial name
- Gibberula infundibulum Bozzetti, 1994

= Gibberula infundibulum =

Species of gastropod

Gibberula infundibulum is a species of sea snail, a marine gastropod mollusk, in the family Cystiscidae.

== Distribution ==
This species occurs in the Indian Ocean off Somalia.
