= Gibberula japonica =

Scientific classification
- Kingdom: Animalia
- Phylum: Mollusca
- Class: Gastropoda
- Subclass: Caenogastropoda
- Order: Neogastropoda
- Family: Cystiscidae
- Subfamily: Cystiscinae
- Genus: Gibberula
- Species: G. japonica

Binomial name
- Gibberula japonica (Nomura & Hatai, 1940)

Synonyms
- Cystiscus japonicus Nomura & Hatai, 1940

Species of gastropod

Gibberula japonica is a species of sea snail, a marine gastropod mollusk, in the family Cystiscidae.
