= Gibberula insularum =

Scientific classification
- Kingdom: Animalia
- Phylum: Mollusca
- Class: Gastropoda
- Subclass: Caenogastropoda
- Order: Neogastropoda
- Family: Cystiscidae
- Subfamily: Cystiscinae
- Genus: Gibberula
- Species: G. insularum

Binomial name
- Gibberula insularum (Roth & Coan, 1971)

Synonyms
- Granula insularum Roth & Coan, 1971

Species of gastropod

Gibberula insularum is a species of sea snail, a marine gastropod mollusk, in the family Cystiscidae.

== Distribution ==
This species occurs in Galapagos.
