= Gibberula albotriangularis =

Scientific classification
- Kingdom: Animalia
- Phylum: Mollusca
- Class: Gastropoda
- Subclass: Caenogastropoda
- Order: Neogastropoda
- Family: Cystiscidae
- Subfamily: Cystiscinae
- Genus: Gibberula
- Species: G. albotriangularis

Binomial name
- Gibberula albotriangularis Rolán & Fernandes, 1997

Species of gastropod

Gibberula albotriangularis is a species of sea snail, a marine gastropod mollusk, in the family Cystiscidae.
