= Gibberula thetisae =

Scientific classification
- Kingdom: Animalia
- Phylum: Mollusca
- Class: Gastropoda
- Subclass: Caenogastropoda
- Order: Neogastropoda
- Family: Cystiscidae
- Subfamily: Cystiscinae
- Genus: Gibberula
- Species: G. thetisae

Binomial name
- Gibberula thetisae Espinosa, Ortea & Caballer, 2011

Species of gastropod

Gibberula thetisae is a species of sea snail, a marine gastropod mollusk, in the family Cystiscidae.
