= Gibberula peterbonuttii =

Scientific classification
- Kingdom: Animalia
- Phylum: Mollusca
- Class: Gastropoda
- Subclass: Caenogastropoda
- Order: Neogastropoda
- Family: Cystiscidae
- Subfamily: Cystiscinae
- Genus: Gibberula
- Species: G. peterbonuttii

Binomial name
- Gibberula peterbonuttii Cossignani & Lorenz, 2018

Species of gastropod

Gibberula peterbonuttii is a species of sea snail, a marine gastropod mollusk, in the family Cystiscidae. This species is found in Oman.
