= Gibberula cavinae =

Scientific classification
- Kingdom: Animalia
- Phylum: Mollusca
- Class: Gastropoda
- Subclass: Caenogastropoda
- Order: Neogastropoda
- Family: Cystiscidae
- Subfamily: Cystiscinae
- Genus: Gibberula
- Species: G. cavinae

Binomial name
- Gibberula cavinae Cossignani & Perugia, 2010

Species of gastropod

Gibberula cavinae is a species of sea snail, a marine gastropod mollusk, in the family Cystiscidae.
