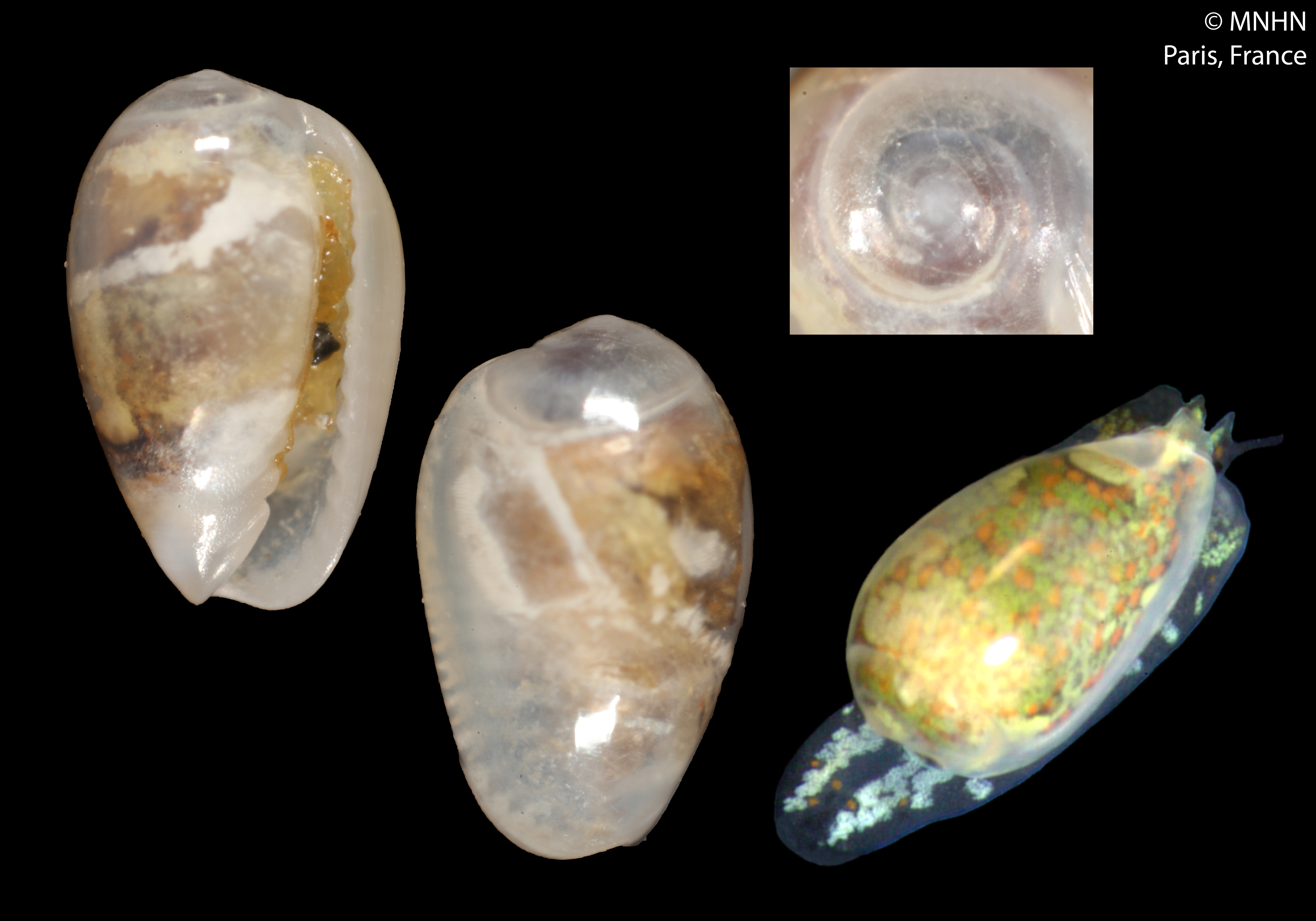
- Gibberula celerae

Scientific classification
- Kingdom: Animalia
- Phylum: Mollusca
- Class: Gastropoda
- Subclass: Caenogastropoda
- Order: Neogastropoda
- Family: Cystiscidae
- Subfamily: Cystiscinae
- Genus: Gibberula; Swainson, 1840

Type species
- Marginella zonata Swainson, 1840

Synonyms
- Cryptospira (Gibberula) Swainson, 1840; Diluculum Barnard, 1962; Epiginella Laseron, 1957; Granula Jousseaume, 1875; Kogomea Habe, 1951; Lataginella Laseron, 1957; Marginella (Gibberula) Swainson, 1840; Marginella (Granula) Jousseaume, 1875; Marginella (Kogomea) Habe, 1951; Phyloginella Laseron, 1957; Vetaginella Laseron, 1957

= Gibberula =

Genus of sea snails

Gibberula is a genus of minute sea snail, a marine gastropod mollusk or micromollusk in the family Cystiscidae, previously placed in the family Marginellidae, the margin shells or marginellids.

(Note: Gastropod taxonomy has been in flux for many years. This is especially true currently, because of new research in molecular phylogeny. Because of all this ongoing change, different reliable sources can yield very different classifications, especially within certain poorly understood groups.)

Other genus-group names are available for small shells resembling Gibberula. These include Granula Jousseaume, 1875 and Kogomea Habe, 1951. They are distinguished from Gibberula only on the basis of smaller size and other rather tenuous conchological differentiations.

== Shell description ==
The shell of this genus is 1.5 to 10 mm in length, ovoid, stout, with a small, low spire. The outer lip is thickened but without an external varix. It is usually denticulated inside. The columella has several plaits on a thickened rim, decreasing in size towards the posterior end. The siphonal canal is distinctly notched.

== Animal ==
=== Head and foot ===
The head is deeply divided in two. There are two short cephalic tentacles and two small anterior lobes. The eyes are a short distance behinde the tentacles. The mouth is provided with an extensible proboscis. The foot is only slightly longer than the shell when extended. In some species, the sole lies flat on the substrate when the animal is crawling. Others have the edge of the propodium raised, developed as parapodia which fit the head/tentacles in the manner of many tectibranchs.

Color pattern of the head and foot is a useful taxonomic character in all the species.

=== Mantle ===
The mantle does not extend over the shell during normal activity. A tongue shaped, translucent lobe may be seen on the left side in some instances. The internal mantle is usually visible through the shell. It may be brightly coloured in the smaller species with a featureless, translucent shell, and its pattern is then continued into the spire over the visceral mass. The siphon is short and inconspicuous, often bordered by a small pad.

=== Reproduction ===
All species of Cystiscids have a direct development without a planktonic phase.

== Species ==
The separation between the genera Persicula and Gibberula is not clearcut and currently follows a rather arbitrary criterion where the large species with (usually with complex colour pattern) are placed in Persicula and the smaller species with a banded or uniform colour pattern in Gibberula, leaving in between many ambiguous species. To date (2010) there is no phylogenetic analysis behind the current generic placements.

- Gibberula ablita (Laseron, 1957)
- Gibberula abyssicola Monterosato in Locard, 1897
- Gibberula achenea Roth & Coan, 1971
- Gibberula adyae Espinosa & Ortea, 2019
- Gibberula adzubae Ortea, 2015
- Gibberula aequatorialis Thiele, 1925
- Gibberula agapeta Watson, 1886
- Gibberula agricola Faber, 2005
- Gibberula ahuiri Cossignani, 2020
- Gibberula albotriangularis Rolán & Fernandes, 1997
- Gibberula aldridgei Usticke, 1969
- Gibberula almadiensis Pin & Boyer, 1995
- Gibberula almo Bartsch, 1915
- † Gibberula amurakucensis Pacaud, 2019
- Gibberula andreahirundae Cossignani & Lorenz, 2019
- Gibberula angelarum Cossignani & Lorenz, 2018
- Gibberula aperta McCleery, 2008
- † Gibberula aquitanensis Lozouet, 1998
- Gibberula ardovinii Cossignani, 2006
- Gibberula arubagrandis McCleery, 2008
- Gibberula asellina Jousseaume, 1875
- Gibberula atlantidea Knudsen, 1956
- Gibberula atwoodae Ortea, 2015
- Gibberula audreyae Cossignani, 2006
- Gibberula aurata Bavay, 1913
- Gibberula aurelieae Ortea, 2017
- Gibberula ayzae Ortea & Moro, 2020
- Gibberula baisrei Espinosa & Ortea, 2007
- Gibberula belizensis McCleery, 2008
- Gibberula benguelensis Jousseaume, 1875
- Gibberula bensoni (Reeve, 1865)
- Gibberula benyi Espinosa & Ortea, 2007
- Gibberula betancourtae Ortea, 2015
- Gibberula boettgeri (Maltzan, 1884)
- Gibberula borbonica Boyer, 2014
- † Gibberula bezoyensis Lozouet, 2019
- Gibberula boulmerkae Ortea, 2015
- Gibberula boyeri Cossignani, 2006
- Gibberula bozzettii Cossignani & Lorenz, 2020
- Gibberula bozzettii Cossignani & Lorenz, 2020
- Gibberula bribri Espinosa y Ortea, 2000
- Gibberula bulbosa Reeve, 1865
- Gibberula burnupi Sowerby III, 1897
- Gibberula caelata (Monterosato, 1897)
- Gibberula candida Cossignani, 2008
- Gibberula caribetica Espinosa and Ortea, 2002
- Gibberula cavernicola Espinosa & Ortea, 2007
- Gibberula cavinae Cossignani & Perugia, 2010
- Gibberula ceciliae Espinosa & Ortea, 2019
- Gibberula celerae McCleery, 2008
- Gibberula cherubini (Bavay, 1922)
- Gibberula chiarae Bozzetti & Cossignani, 2009
- Gibberula chudeaui Bavay, 1910
- Gibberula chumi Espinosa & Ortea, 2019
- Gibberula cincta Boyer, 2003
- Gibberula colombiana Boyer, 2003
- Gibberula columnella Bavay, 1913
- Gibberula compressa Laseron, 1957
- Gibberula conejoensis McCleery, 2008
- Gibberula confusa Gofas, 1989
- † Gibberula constantinensis Le Renard & van Nieulande, 1985
- † Gibberula cooperi Fehse & Wiese, 1992
- Gibberula cozzii Ortea & Moro, 2020
- Gibberula crassa McCleery, 2009
- Gibberula cristata Gofas, 1989
- Gibberula cristinae Tisselli, Agamennone & Giunchi, 2009
- Gibberula cristinae Ortea & Moro, 2020 (provisional name - homonym of Gibberula cristinae Tisselli, Agamennone & Giunchi, 2009)
- Gibberula cucullata Gofas & Fernandes, 1987
- Gibberula decorfasciata Rolán & Fernandes, 1997
- † Gibberula degrangei (Peyrot, 1928)
- Gibberula delapazi Ortea & Moro, 2020
- Gibberula delarrochae Ortea, 2015
- Gibberula dennisi Ortea & Moro, 2020
- Gibberula dens Reeve, 1865
- Gibberula denticulata Boyer, 2018
- Gibberula diadema Pin & Boyer, 1995
- Gibberula differens E. A. Smith, 1904
- Gibberula diplostreptus May, 1916
- Gibberula dosmosquises Espinosa, Ortea & Caballer, 2011
- Gibberula dulcis E. A. Smith, 1904
- † Gibberula eliopsis La Renard & van Nieulande, 1985
- Gibberula elisae Bozzetti & Cossignani, 2009
- Gibberula eloinae Espinosa and Ortea, 2007
- Gibberula elvirae Moreno, 2012
- Gibberula encaustica Reeve, 1865 (taxon inquirendum)
- Gibberula epigrus Reeve, 1865
- Gibberula estherae Ortea & Moro, 2017
- Gibberula eugeniae Espinosa & Ortea, 2019
- Gibberula evadne Dall & Simpson, 1901
- Gibberula evandroi Ortea & Moro, 2018
- Gibberula falsijaponica (Habe, 1961)
- Gibberula farlensis McCleery, 2009
- Gibberula fatimae Ortea & Moro, 2018
- Gibberula ficula Murdoch & Suter, 1906
- Gibberula fortis McCleery, 2008
- Gibberula fortisminor McCleery, 2008
- Gibberula gabryae Bozzetti, 1993
- Gibberula garzae Espinosa & Ortea, 2019
- Gibberula gironai Espinosa and Ortea, 2007
- Gibberula giulianae Cossignani & Lorenz, 2020
- Gibberula giulianae Cossignani & Lorenz, 2020
- Gibberula goodallae Ortea, 2015
- Gibberula gradatim McCleery, 2008
- Gibberula grafae Ortea, 2015
- Gibberula granulinaformis McCleery, 2008
- Gibberula gruveli Bavay, 1913
- Gibberula hardingae Dell, 1956
- Gibberula hendricksae Ortea, 2015
- Gibberula hernandezi Contreras & Talavera, 1988
- Gibberula hirami Espinosa and Ortea, 2007
- Gibberula infundibulum Bozzetti, 1994
- Gibberula inopinata Barnard, 1962
- Gibberula insularum Roth & Coan, 1971
- Gibberula isinbayevae Ortea, 2015
- Gibberula jansseni van Aartsen, Menkhorst & Gittenberger, 1984
- Gibberula japonica (Nomura & Hatai, 1940)
- Gibberula jayi Boyer, 2014
- Gibberula jeanae Lussi & Smith, 1998
- Gibberula jenphillipsi McCleery, 2008
- Gibberula jorgefoyoi Espinosa and Ortea, 2007
- Gibberula lachryma (Reeve, 1865)
- Gibberula judithae Ortea & Moro, 2017
- Gibberula lacasito Ortea, Moro & Espinosa, 2020
- Gibberula lalaina Bozzetti, 2012
- Gibberula langostera Espinosa and Ortea, 2007
- Gibberula laritzae Espinosa & Ortea, 2014
- Gibberula lavalleeana (d'Orbigny, 1842)
- Gibberula laviuda Espinosa & Ortea, 2019
- Gibberula lazaroi Contreras, 1992
- Gibberula leibovitzae Ortea, 2015
- Gibberula lessingae Ortea, 2015
- Gibberula lifouana Crosse, 1871
- Gibberula linanprietoae Cossignani & Ahuir, 2020
- Gibberula lorenziana Bozzetti, 1997
- Gibberula louisae Bavay, 1913
- Gibberula lucia Jousseaume, 1877
- Gibberula luglii Cossignani, 2001
- Gibberula lutea Jousseaume, 1884
- Gibberula macarioi Espinosa and Ortea, 2006
- Gibberula macula McCleery, 2009
- Gibberula madbelono Ortea, 2017
- Gibberula maldiviana (T. Cossignani, 2001)
- Gibberula mamillata Boyer, 2014
- Gibberula mandyi Espinosa and Ortea, 2006
- Gibberula manzanillera Espinosa & Ortea, 2019
- Gibberula mapipi Ortea, 2017
- Gibberula marcelae Espinosa & Ortea, 2019
- Gibberula marinae Wakefield & McCleery, 2004
- Gibberula marioi Espinosa and Ortea, 2000
- Gibberula mariscali Espinosa and Ortea, 2007
- Gibberula martae Ortea & Moro, 2020
- Gibberula martinae Cossignani, 2001
- Gibberula martingaiteae Ortea, 2015
- Gibberula mazagonica Melvill, 1892
- Gibberula mendacis Gofas, 1989
- Gibberula metoo Ortea & Moro, 2018
- Gibberula miliaria (Linnaeus, 1758)
- Gibberula mimetica Gofas, 1989
- Gibberula mirpuriolo Ortea, Moro & Espinosa, 2020
- Gibberula modica Gofas & Fernandes, 1987
- Gibberula mooi Cossignani & Lorenz, 2020
- Gibberula moscatellii Boyer, 2004
- Gibberula navratilovae Ortea, 2015
- Gibberula nebulosa Boyer, 2002
- Gibberula nilsi Espinosa and Ortea, 2007
- Gibberula norvisae Espinosa & Ortea, 2014
- Gibberula novemprovincialis (Yokoyama, 1928)
- Gibberula nuryana Ortea & Moro, 2018
- Gibberula nussbaumae Ortea, 2015
- Gibberula occidentalis McCleery, 2008
- Gibberula olivai Espinosa and Ortea, 2006
- Gibberula olivella Cossignani, 2001
- Gibberula omneiae Cossignani & Lorenz, 2020
- Gibberula oriens McCleery, 2008
- Gibberula oryza (Lamarck, 1822)
- Gibberula ovata Habe, 1951
- Gibberula ovoides Boyer, 2017
- Gibberula pacifica Pease, 1868
- Gibberula palazzii Cossignani, 2001
- Gibberula pallata Bavay, 1913
- Gibberula palmasola Espinosa, Ortea & Caballer, 2011
- Gibberula peterbonuttii Cossignani & Lorenz, 2018
- Gibberula pascuana Rehder, 1980
- Gibberula pfeifferi Faber, 2004
- Gibberula phantasma Espinosa & Ortea, 2019
- Gibberula philippii (Monterosato, 1878)
- Gibberula pignonae Ortea, 2015
- Gibberula poppei Cossignani, 2001
- † Gibberula prunicallosa La Renard & van Nieulande, 1985
- † Gibberula pruvosti La Renard & van Nieulande, 1985
- † Gibberula pseudoaquitanica Lozouet, 2019
- Gibberula punctillum Gofas & Fernandes, 1987
- Gibberula quadrifasciata (Marrat, 1873)
- Gibberula quatrefortis McCleery, 2008
- Gibberula ramsi Espinosa and Ortea, 2007
- Gibberula raquelae Ortea & Moro, 2018
- Gibberula rauli Fernandes, 1988
- Gibberula recondita Monterosato, 1884
- Gibberula robinsonae Ortea, 2015
- Gibberula ronchinorum Bozzetti, 2017
- Gibberula ros Reeve, 1865
- Gibberula rowlingae Ortea, 2015
- Gibberula rufanensis (W. H. Turton, 1932)
- Gibberula sassenae Ortea, 2015
- Gibberula sandwicensis (Pease, 1860)
- Gibberula savignyi Issel, 1869
- Gibberula scalarispira Bozzetti, 1997
- Gibberula sebastiani Bozzetti, 1997
- Gibberula secreta Monterosato, 1889
- Gibberula sierrai Espinosa and Ortea, 2000
- Gibberula silviae Espinosa & Ortea, 2019
- Gibberula simii Cossignani & Lorenz, 2019
- Gibberula simonae Smiriglio in Giannuzzi-Savelli et al., 2003
- Gibberula simplex (Laseron, 1957)
- Gibberula socoae Espinosa & Ortea, 2019
- Gibberula soniae Espinosa & Ortea, 2019
- Gibberula spiriplana (Jousseaume, 1882)
- Gibberula squamosa Boyer, 2003
- Gibberula stella McCleery, 2008
- Gibberula striata Laseron, 1957
- † Gibberula subovulatoides Lozouet, 2019
- Gibberula sueziensis Issel, 1869
- Gibberula subbulbosa Tate, 1878
- Gibberula subtrigona Carpenter, 1865
- Gibberula tahaukuensis Cossignani, 2001
- Gibberula tantula Gofas, 1989
- Gibberula teresitae Espinosa & Ortea, 2019
- Gibberula themisae Espinosa and Ortea, 2007
- Gibberula thetisae Espinosa, Ortea & Caballer, 2011
- Gibberula thomensis (Tomlin, 1919)
- Gibberula turbinata Boyer, 2018
- Gibberula turgidula (Locard & Caziot, 1900)
- Gibberula ubitaensis Espinosa and Ortea, 2000
- Gibberula ubitalta McCleery, 2009
- Gibberula valentinae Cossignani & Lorenz, 2020
- Gibberula valentinae Cossignani & Lorenz, 2020
- Gibberula varicosa Boyer, 2017
- Gibberula veilae Ortea, 2015
- Gibberula velox McCleery, 2008
- Gibberula ventricosa Boyer, 2017
- Gibberula vermiglioi Cossignani & Ahuir, 2020
- Gibberula vignali (Dautzenberg & Fischer, 1896)
- Gibberula vitium McCleery, 2008
- Gibberula vomoensis Wakefield & McCleery, 2004
- Gibberula watkinsae Ortea, 2015
- Gibberula yidii Cossignani, 2006
- Gibberula yoshikoae Cossignani & Lorenz, 2019
- Gibberula zambranoae Ortea, 2015
- Gibberula zonata Swainson, 1840

Taxa inquirenda

- Gibberula aldridgei (Nowell-Usticke, 1969)
- Gibberula encaustica (Reeve, 1865)
- Gibberula rolani Cossignani & Cecalupo, 2005

Species brought into synonymy

- Gibberula bocasensis Olsson & McGinty, 1958: synonym of Plesiocystiscus bocasensis (Olsson & McGinty, 1958)
- Gibberula jousseaumi Rochebrune, 1881: synonym of Volvarina sauliae (Sowerby II, 1846)
- Gibberula rachmaninovi Kellner, 2003: synonym of Volvarina sauliae (Sowerby II, 1846)
- Gibberula sandwicensis (Pease, 1860): synonym of Cystiscus sandwicensis (Pease, 1860)
