= List of gastropods described in 2015 =

This list of gastropods described in 2015 is a list of new taxa of snails and slugs of every kind that have been described (following the rules of the ICZN) during the year 2015. The list only includes taxa at the level of genus or species. For changes in taxonomy above the level of genus, see Changes in the taxonomy of gastropods since 2005.

== Marine gastropods ==
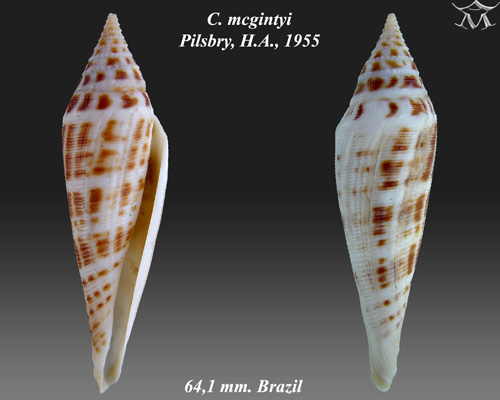
A shell of Conasprella edpetuchi from Brazil

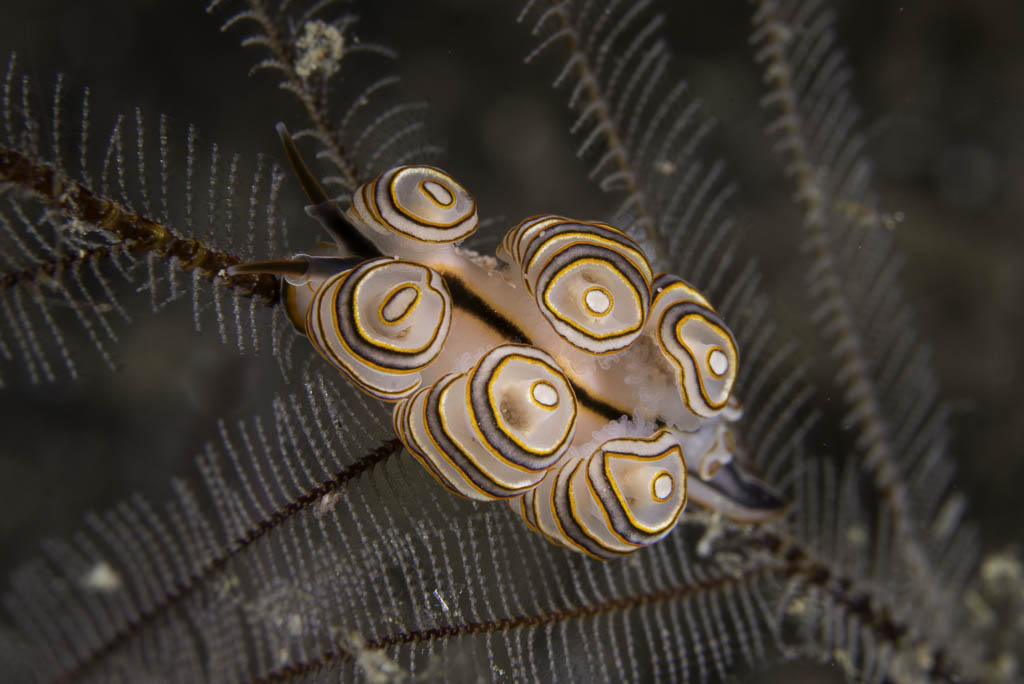
The nudibranch Doto greenamyeri, Pulau Sangeang, Indonesia

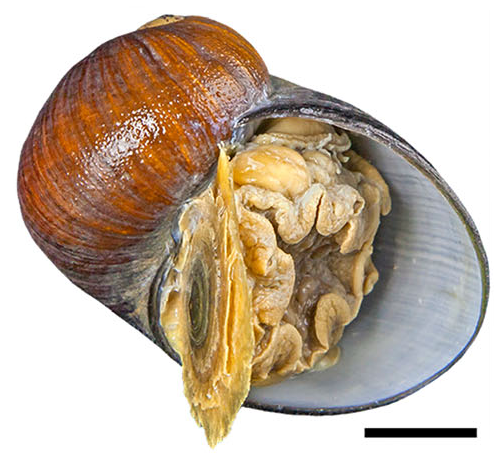
The deep sea snail Gigantopelta chessoia was discovered in 2012 and described in 2015.

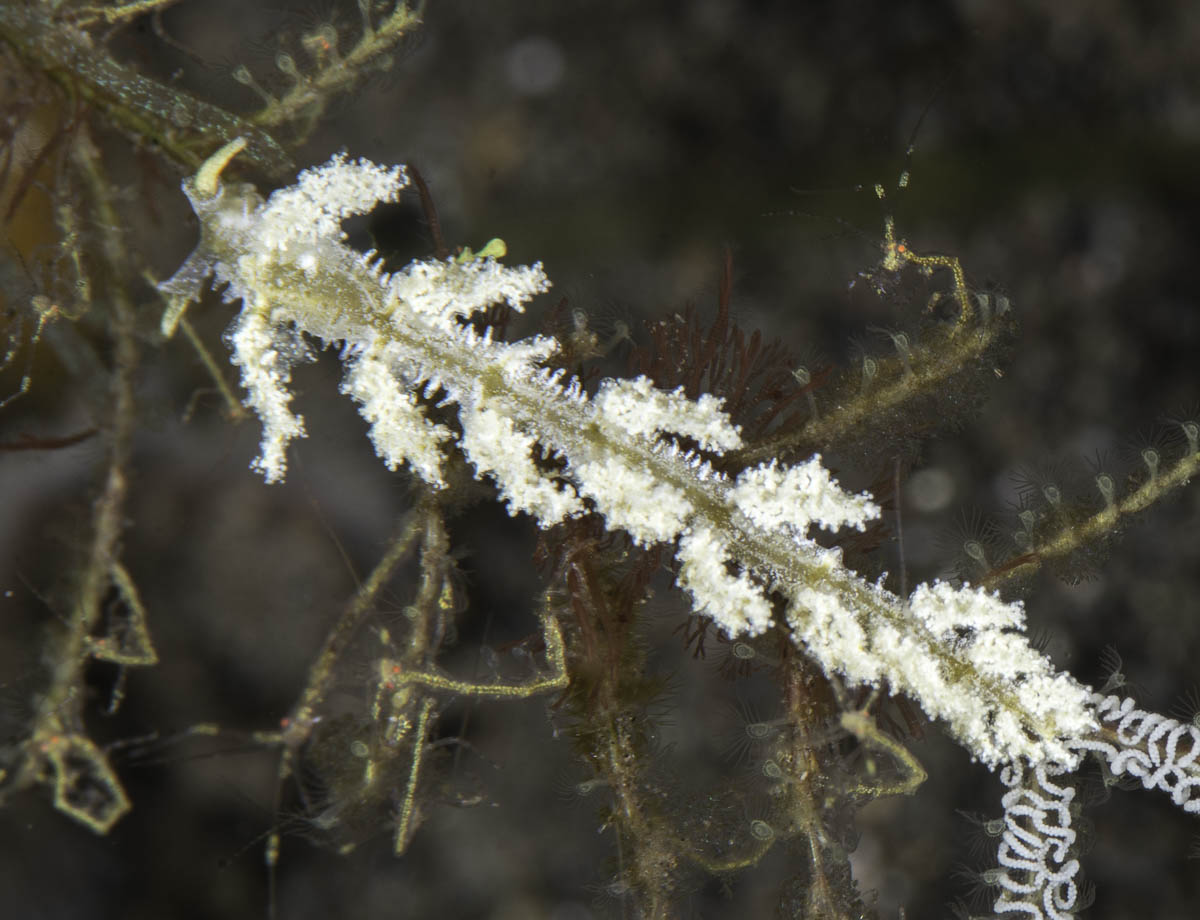
The nudibranch Kabeiro phasmida, Bontoh, Pulau Sangeang, Indonesia

- Aegires acauda Ortea, Moro & Espinosa, 2015
- Aegires corrugatus Ortea, Moro & Espinosa, 2015
- Aegires evorae Moro & Ortea, 2015
- Aegires gracilis Ortea, Moro & Espinosa, 2015
- Aegires lagrifaensis Ortea, Moro & Espinosa, 2015
- Anachis rechonchuda Lima & Guimarães, 2015
- Anacithara biconica Barros, Santana & Lima, 2015
- Anacithara pupiforme Barros, Santana & Lima, 2015
- Anacithara pyrgoforme Barros, Santana & Lima, 2015
- Anatoma brychia Pimenta & Geiger, 2015
- Anatoma campense Pimenta & Geiger, 2015
- Anatoma copiosa Pimenta & Geiger, 2015
- Anatoma espiritosantense Pimenta & Geiger, 2015
- Antillophos liui Zhang & Zhang, 2015
- Aplysiopsis singularis Moro & Ortea, 2015
- Berthella punctata Alvim & Pimenta, 2015
- Berthellina ignis Alvim & Pimenta, 2015
- Bouchetia wareni Houart & Héros, 2015
- Bulbaeolidia oasis Caballer & Ortea, 2015
- Bullina terracota Moro, Ortea & Pérez-Dionis in Moro & Ortea, 2015
- Cerithiella atali Fernandes, Garofalo & Pimenta, 2015
- Cerithiella candela Fernandes, Garofalo & Pimenta, 2015
- Cheirodonta mizifio Fernandes & Pimenta, 2015
- Chicomurex globus Houart, Moe & Chen, 2015
- Chicomurex pseudosuperbus Houart, Moe & Chen, 2015
- Conus hughmorrisoni Lorenz & Puillandre, 2015
- Crassicantharus aureatus Fraussen & Stahlschmidt, 2015
- Crassicantharus beslui Fraussen & Stahlschmidt, 2015
- Crassicantharus boutetorum Fraussen & Stahlschmidt, 2015
- Crassicantharus feioides Fraussen & Stahlschmidt, 2015
- Crassicantharus letourneuxi Fraussen & Stahlschmidt, 2015
- Crassicantharus metallicus Fraussen & Stahlschmidt, 2015
- Crassicantharus magnificus Fraussen & Stahlschmidt, 2015
- Crassicantharus nexus Fraussen & Stahlschmidt, 2015
- Crassicantharus perlatus Fraussen & Stahlschmidt, 2015
- Cyclostremiscus albachiarae Perugia, 2015
- Dalliconus edpetuchi Monnier, Limpalaër, Roux & Berschauer, 2015
- Dentimargo caribbaeus Espinosa & Ortea, 2015
- Dentimargo kicoi Espinosa & Ortea, 2015
- Dentimargo mayabequensis Espinosa & Ortea, 2015
- Discodoris pliconotos Moro & Ortea, 2015
- Doto africoronata Shipman & Gosliner, 2015
- Doto canaricoronata Moro & Ortea, 2015
- Doto greenamyeri Shipman & Gosliner, 2015
- Doto tingoi Moro & Ortea, 2015
- Edmundsina lazaroi Moro, Ortea & Bacallado in Moro & Ortea, 2015
- Engina mirabilis Fraussen & Stahlschmidt, 2015
- Eratoidea jaumei Espinosa & Ortea, 2015
- Eubranchus amazighi Tamsouri, Carmona, Moukrim & Cervera, 2015
- Eulimetta atlantica Souza & Pimenta, 2015
- Eutriphora costai Fernandes & Pimenta, 2015
- Facelina carmelae Moro & Ortea, 2015
- Flexopteron akainakares Houart & Héros, 2015
- Fofinha cabrerae Moro & Ortea, 2015
- Gargamella blokoverdensis Moro & Ortea, 2015
- Gibberula adzubae Ortea, 2015
- Gibberula atwoodae Ortea, 2015
- Gibberula betancourtae Ortea, 2015
- Gibberula boulmerkae Ortea, 2015
- Gibberula delarrochae Ortea, 2015
- Gibberula goodallae Ortea, 2015
- Gibberula grafae Ortea, 2015
- Gibberula hendricksae Ortea, 2015
- Gibberula isinbayevae Ortea, 2015
- Gibberula leibovitzae Ortea, 2015
- Gibberula lessingae Ortea, 2015
- Gibberula martingaiteae Ortea, 2015
- Gibberula navratilovae Ortea, 2015
- Gibberula nussbaumae Ortea, 2015
- Gibberula pignonae Ortea, 2015
- Gibberula robinsonae Ortea, 2015
- Gibberula rowlingae Ortea, 2015
- Gibberula sassenae Ortea, 2015
- Gibberula veilae Ortea, 2015
- Gibberula watkinsae Ortea, 2015
- Gibberula zambranoae Ortea, 2015
- Gigantopelta Chen, Linse, Roterman, Copley & Rogers, 2015
- Gigantopelta aegis Chen, Linse, Roterman, Copley & Rogers, 2015
- Gigantopelta chessoia Chen, Linse, Roterman, Copley & Rogers, 2015
- Gondwanorbis fueguensis Rumi & Gutiérrez Gregoric in Rumi et al., 2015
- Gondwanorbis tricarinatus Rumi & Gutiérrez Gregoric in Rumi et al., 2015
- Haplocochlias arawakorum Rubio & Rolán, 2015
- Haplocochlias christopheri Rubio & Rolán, 2015
- Haplocochlias karukera Rubio & Rolán, 2015
- Hermaea cantabra Caballer & Ortea, 2015
- Hyalina angelquirosi Espinosa & Ortea, 2015
- Hyalina aurorae Espinosa & Ortea, 2015
- Kabeiro christianae Shipman & Gosliner, 2015
- Kabeiro phasmida Shipman & Gosliner, 2015
- Kabeiro rubroreticulata Shipman & Gosliner, 2015
- Lyria ogasawarana Bail & Chino, 2015
- Manzonia martinsi Ávila & Cordeiro in Cordeiro & Avila, 2015
- Mitromorpha alyssae Amati, Smriglio & Oliverio, 2015
- Mitromorpha bogii Amati, Smriglio & Oliverio, 2015
- Mitromorpha cossyrae Amati, Smriglio & Oliverio, 2015
- Mitromorpha mariottinii Amati, Smriglio & Oliverio, 2015
- Mitromorpha mifsudi Amati, Smriglio & Oliverio, 2015
- Mitromorpha nofronii Amati, Smriglio & Oliverio, 2015
- Mitromorpha tricolorata Amati, Smriglio & Oliverio, 2015
- Murexsul mananteninaensis Houart & Héros, 2015
- Nanaphora leei Fernandes & Pimenta, 2015
- Naquetia rhondae Houart & Lorenz, 2015
- Nassaria vermeiji Fraussen & Stahlschmidt, 2015
- Notodoris lanzarotensis Moro & Ortea, 2015
- Notovoluta kalotinae Bail & Limpus, 2015
- Panderevela dacilae Moro & Ortea, 2015
- Panderevela ipse Ortea, Moro & Espinosa in Moro & Ortea, 2015
- Parviturbo annejoffeae Rubio, Rolán & Lee in Rubio, Rolán & Fernández-Garcés, 2015
- Parviturbo azoricus Rubio, Rolán & Segers in Rubio, Rolán & Fernández-Garcés, 2015
- Parviturbo billfranki Rubio, Rolán & Lee in Rubio, Rolán & Fernández-Garcés, 2015
- Parviturbo boucheti Rubio, Rolán & Fernández-Garcés, 2015
- Parviturbo brasiliensis Rubio, Rolán & Lee in Rubio, Rolán & Fernández-Garcés, 2015
- Parviturbo dispar Rubio, Rolán & Letourneux in Rubio, Rolán & Fernández-Garcés, 2015
- Parviturbo ergasticus Rubio, Rolán & Gofas in Rubio, Rolán & Fernández-Garcés, 2015
- Parviturbo fortius Rubio, Rolán & Fernández-Garcés, 2015
- Parviturbo guadeloupensis Rubio, Rolán & Fernández-Garcés, 2015
- Parviturbo gofasi Rubio, Rolán & Fernández-Garcés, 2015
- Parviturbo javiercondei Rubio, Rolán & Fernández-Garcés, 2015
- Parviturbo marcosi Rubio, Rolán & Fernández-Garcés, 2015
- Parviturbo multispiralis Rubio, Rolán & Fernández-Garcés, 2015
- Parviturbo pombali Rubio, Rolán & Fernández-Garcés, 2015
- Parviturbo rectangularis Rubio, Rolán & Fernández-Garcés, 2015
- Parviturbo robustior Rubio, Rolán & Lee in Rubio, Rolán & Fernández-Garcés, 2015
- Parviturbo seamountensis Rubio, Rolán & Gofas in Rubio, Rolán & Fernández-Garcés, 2015
- Parviturbo vanuatuensis Rubio, Rolán & Fernández-Garcés, 2015
- Parviturbo zylmanae Rubio, Rolán & Lee in Rubio, Rolán & Fernández-Garcés, 2015
- Patagonorbis nahuelhuapensis Rumi & Gutiérrez Gregoric in Rumi et al., 2015
- Perotrochus pseudogranulosus Anseeuw, Puillandre, Utge & Bouchet, 2015
- Perotrochus wareni Anseeuw, Puillandre, Utge & Bouchet, 2015
- Profundiconus smirnoides Tenorio, 2015
- Prunum arangoi Espinosa & Ortea, 2015
- Prunum egmontensis Espinosa & Ortea, 2015
- Prunum ianusi Espinosa & Ortea, 2015
- Prunum hunabi Espinosa & Ortea, 2015
- Prunum poeyi Espinosa & Ortea, 2015
- Pugilina tupiniquim Abbate & Simone, 2015
- Runcinella condio Moro & Ortea, 2015
- Setia alexandrae Ávila & Cordeiro in Cordeiro & Avila, 2015
- Setia ermelindoi Ávila & Cordeiro in Cordeiro & Avila, 2015
- Setia homerica Romani & Scuderi, 2015
- Setia netoae Ávila & Cordeiro in Cordeiro & Avila, 2015
- Simnia jacintoi Fehse & Trigo, 2015
- Siphonochelus aethomorpha Houart & Héros, 2015
- Tambja mediterranea Domínguez, Pola & Ramón, 2015
- Taringa arcaica Moro & Ortea, 2015
- Taringa robledales Ortea, Moro & Espinosa in Moro & Ortea, 2015
- Tenorioconus monicae Petuch & Berschauer, 2015
- Tenorioconus rosi Petuch & Berschauer, 2015
- Thala kawabei Herrmann & Chino, 2015
- Timbellus goniodes Houart & Héros, 2015
- Timbellus pannuceus Houart & Héros, 2015
- Trapania bajamarensis Moro & Ortea, 2015
- Triphora charybdis Fernandes & Pimenta, 2015
- Triphora scylla Fernandes & Pimenta, 2015
- Trituba anubis Fernandes, Garofalo & Pimenta, 2015
- Trophonopsis sparacioi Smriglio, Mariottini & Di Giulio, 2015
- Turbo lorenzi Alf & Kreipl, 2015
- Typhinellus constrictus Houart & Héros, 2015
- Typhinellus jacolombi Houart, 2015
- Typhinellus laminatus Houart & Héros, 2015
- Vexillum croceostoma Marrow, 2015
- Vokesimurex aliquantulus Houart & Héros, 2015
- Volvarina abdieli Espinosa, Ortea & Diez, 2015
- Volvarina aethrae Espinosa & Ortea, 2015
- Volvarina aglae Espinosa & Ortea, 2015
- Volvarina alayoi Espinosa, Ortea & Diez, 2015
- Volvarina alayoni Espinosa & Ortea, 2015
- Volvarina amphitrite Espinosa & Ortea, 2015
- Volvarina anamariae Espinosa & Ortea, 2015
- Volvarina ariadnae Espinosa & Ortea, 2015
- Volvarina bellamatancera Espinosa & Ortea, 2015
- Volvarina bernardoi Espinosa, Ortea & Diez, 2015
- Volvarina borinquensis Espinosa & Ortea, 2015
- Volvarina calliopeae Espinosa & Ortea, 2015
- Volvarina callypsoe Espinosa & Ortea, 2015
- Volvarina caprina Espinosa & Ortea, 2015
- Volvarina casiguaya Espinosa, Ortea & Díez in Espinosa & Ortea, 2015
- Volvarina cienfueguera Espinosa, Ortea & Diez, 2015
- Volvarina cubana Espinosa & Ortea, 2015
- Volvarina cybelesae Espinosa & Ortea, 2015
- Volvarina davidi Espinosa, Ortea & Diez, 2015
- Volvarina dennisi Espinosa, Ortea & Diez, 2015
- Volvarina dorisae Espinosa & Ortea, 2015
- Volvarina fifi Espinosa & Ortea, 2015
- Volvarina gemma Espinosa & Ortea, 2015
- Volvarina guamaense Espinosa, Ortea & Diez, 2015
- Volvarina hemingwayi Espinosa & Ortea, 2015
- Volvarina holguinera Espinosa, Ortea & Diez, 2015
- Volvarina humboldtiana Espinosa, Ortea & Diez, 2015
- Volvarina ireneae Espinosa & Ortea, 2015
- Volvarina irisae Espinosa & Ortea, 2015
- Volvarina ixchelae Espinosa & Ortea, 2015
- Volvarina juancarlosi Espinosa, Ortea & Diez, 2015
- Volvarina juraguaense Espinosa, Ortea & Diez, 2015
- Volvarina larramendii Espinosa, Ortea & Diez, 2015
- Volvarina lilianamariae Espinosa, Ortea & Diez, 2015
- Volvarina nautica Espinosa & Ortea, 2015
- Volvarina nicasioi Espinosa, Ortea & Diez, 2015
- Volvarina pallasae Espinosa & Ortea, 2015
- Volvarina pandorae Espinosa & Ortea, 2015
- Volvarina pedroelcojo Espinosa, Ortea & Diez, 2015
- Volvarina penelope Espinosa & Ortea, 2015
- Volvarina phorcusi Espinosa & Ortea, 2015
- Volvarina rancholunense Espinosa, Ortea & Diez, 2015
- Volvarina santiagocubense Espinosa, Ortea & Diez, 2015
- Volvarina thaliae Espinosa & Ortea, 2015
- Volvarina tobyi Espinosa, Ortea & Diez, 2015
- Volvarina toroensis Espinosa & Ortea, 2015
- Volvarina xamaneki Espinosa & Ortea, 2015
- Volvarina yunkaxi Espinosa & Ortea, 2015

Other taxa

- genus Fofinha Moro & Ortea, 2015
- genus Jenseneria Moro & Ortea, 2015
- genus Panderevela Moro & Ortea, 2015

== Freshwater gastropods ==
- Belgrandiella delevae Georgiev & Glöer, 2015
- Belgrandiella lomica Georgiev & Glöer, 2015
- Bracenica vitojaensis Glöer, Grego, Erőss & Fehér, 2015
- Bythinella anatolica Yıldırım, Kebapçı & Bahadır Koca in Yıldırım, Kebapçı, Bahadır Koca & Yüce, 2015
- Bythinella golemoensis Glöer & Mrkvicka, 2015
- Bythinella gregoi Glöer & Erőss, 2015
- Bythinella istanbulensis Yıldırım, Kebapçı & Yüce in Yıldırım, Kebapçı, Bahadır Koca & Yüce, 2015
- Bythinella magdalenae Yıldırım, Kebapçı & Bahadır Koca in Yıldırım, Kebapçı, Bahadır Koca & Yüce, 2015
- Bythinella melovskii Glöer & Slavevska-Stamenković, 2015
- Bythinella muranyii Glöer & Erőss, 2015
- Bythinella thermophila Glöer, Varga & Mrkvicka, 2015
- Bythinella wilkei Yıldırım, Kebapçı & Bahadır Koca in Yıldırım, Kebapçı, Bahadır Koca & Yüce, 2015
- Bythinia shapkarevi Glöer, Shoreva & Slavevska-Stamenković, 2015
- Bythiospeum blihensis Glöer & Grego, 2015
- Bythiospeum iltchoi Georgiev & Glöer, 2015
- Bythiospeum iltchokolevi Georgiev & Glöer, 2015
- Bythiospeum juliae Georgiev & Glöer, 2015
- Bythiospeum hrustovoensis Glöer & Grego, 2015
- Bythiospeum maroskoi Glöer & Grego, 2015
- Bythiospeum petroedei Glöer & Grego, 2015
- Bythiospeum plivensis Glöer & Grego, 2015
- Bythiospeum szarowskae Glöer, Grego, Erőss & Fehér, 2015
- Caspia milae Boeters, Glöer, Georgiev & Dedov, 2015
- Daphniola magdalenae Falniowski in Falnowski & Sarbu, 2015
- Devetakia veselinae Georgiev & Glöer, 2015
- Ferrissia fivefallsiensis Sankarappan, Chellapandian, Vimalanathan, Mani, Sundaram & Muthukalingan, 2015
- Graecoanatolica nageli Glöer & Pešić, 2015
- Graecoanatolica yildirimi Glöer & Pešić, 2015
- Grossuana falniowskii Georgiev, Glöer, Dedov & Irikov, 2015
- Heleobia deserticola Collado, 2015
- Hemistomia andreae Haase & Zielske, 2015
- Iglica hellenica Falnowski & Sarbu, 2015
- Islamia montenegrina Glöer, Grego, Erőss & Fehér, 2015
- Islamia steffeki Glöer & Grego, 2015
- Lanzaia pesici Glöer, Grego, Erőss & Fehér, 2015
- Mercuria bakeri Glöer, Boeters & Walther, 2015
- Mercuria rolani Glöer, Boeters & Walther, 2015
- Mercuria targuasensis Glöer, Boeters & Walther, 2015
- Mercuria tingitana Glöer, Boeters & Walther, 2015
- Microstygia deltchevi Georgiev & Glöer, 2015
- Moitessieria tatirocae Tarruella, Corbella, Prats, Guillén & Alba, 2015
- Kolevia bulgarica Georgiev & Glöer, 2015
- Leiorhagium adioincola Haase & Zielske, 2015
- Leiorhagium aremuum Haase & Zielske, 2015
- Leiorhagium clandestinum Haase & Zielske, 2015
- Leiorhagium neteae Haase & Zielske, 2015
- Planorbis cretensis Glöer & Hirschfelder, 2015
- Pseudamnicola collingi Boeters, Callot-Girardi & Knebelsberger, 2015
- Pseudamnicola krumensis Glöer, Grego, Erőss & Fehér, 2015
- Pseudamnicola moussonii magozensis Glöer & Boeters, 2015
- Pseudamnicola tajoensis Boeters, Callot-Girardi & Knebelsberger, 2015
- Pseudamnicola tejedoi Boeters, Callot-Girardi & Knebelsberger, 2015
- Pseudamnicola valladolensis kahbei Boeters, Callot-Girardi & Knebelsberger, 2015
- Pseudamnicola valladolensis valladolensis Boeters, Callot-Girardi & Knebelsberger, 2015
- Sumia macedonica Glöer & Mrkvicka, 2015
- Tchangmargarya multilabiata Zhang & Chen in Zhang, Chen, Yang, Jin & Köhler, 2015
- Theodoxus gloeri Odabaşi & Arslan, 2015
- Tryonia infernalis Hershler, Liu & Simpson, 2015
- Valvata kebapcii Odabaşi, Glöer & Yıldırım, 2015

== Land gastropods ==
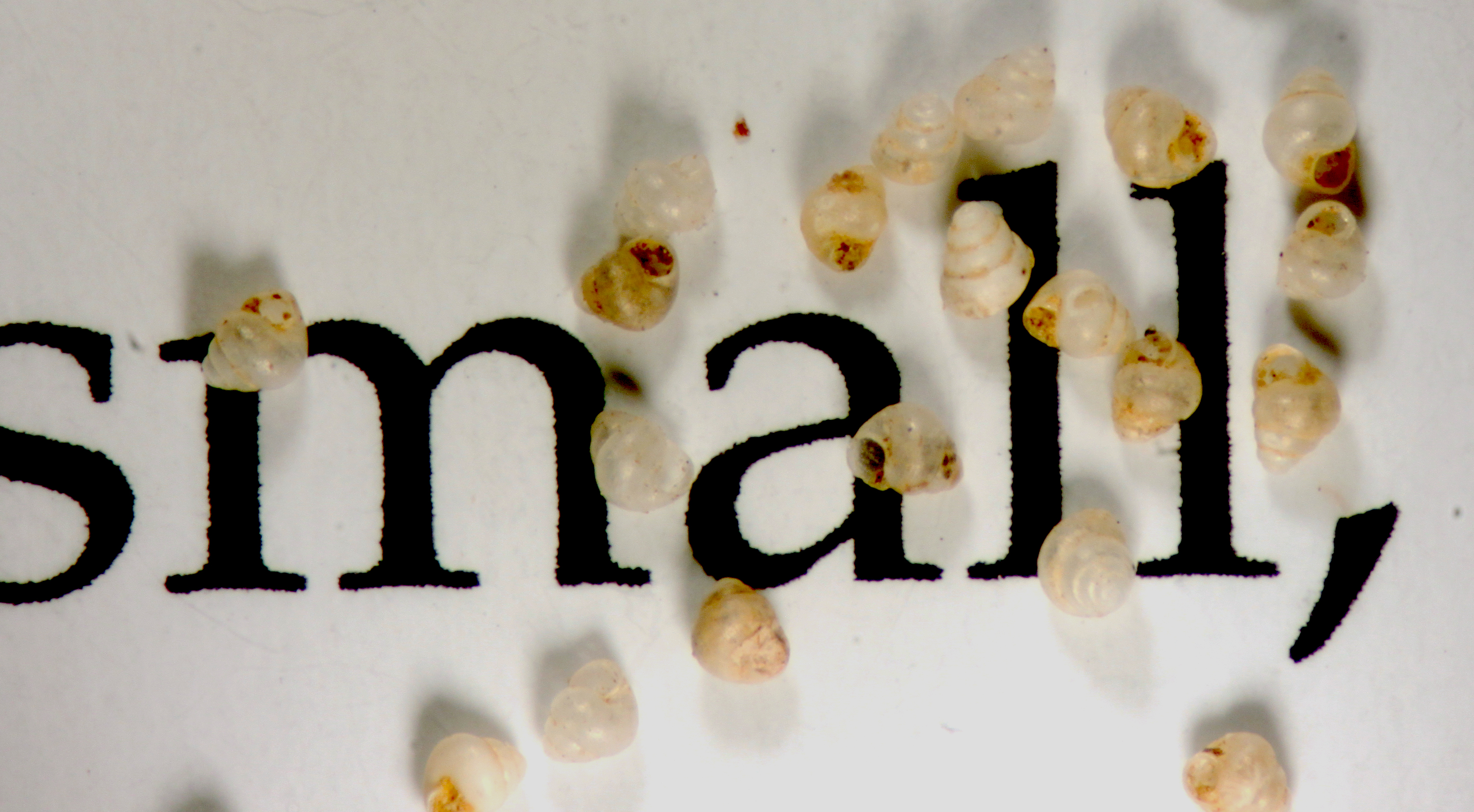
Acmella nana

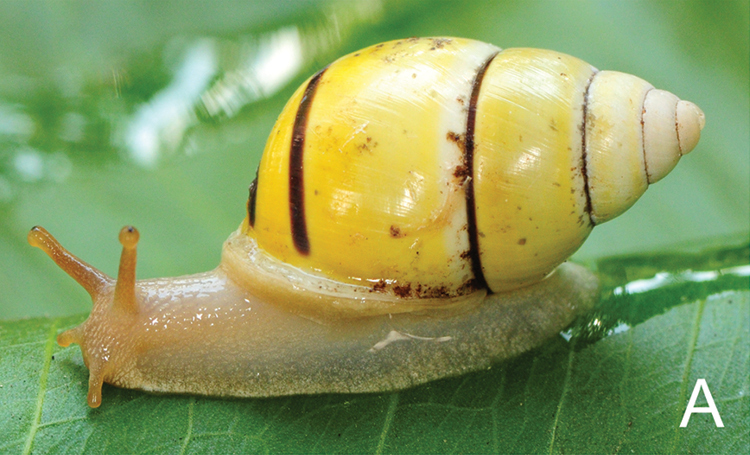
Amphidromus globonevilli

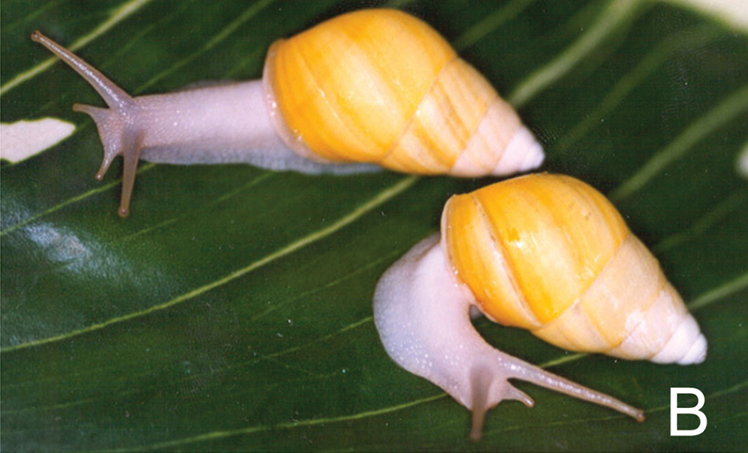
Amphidromus principalis

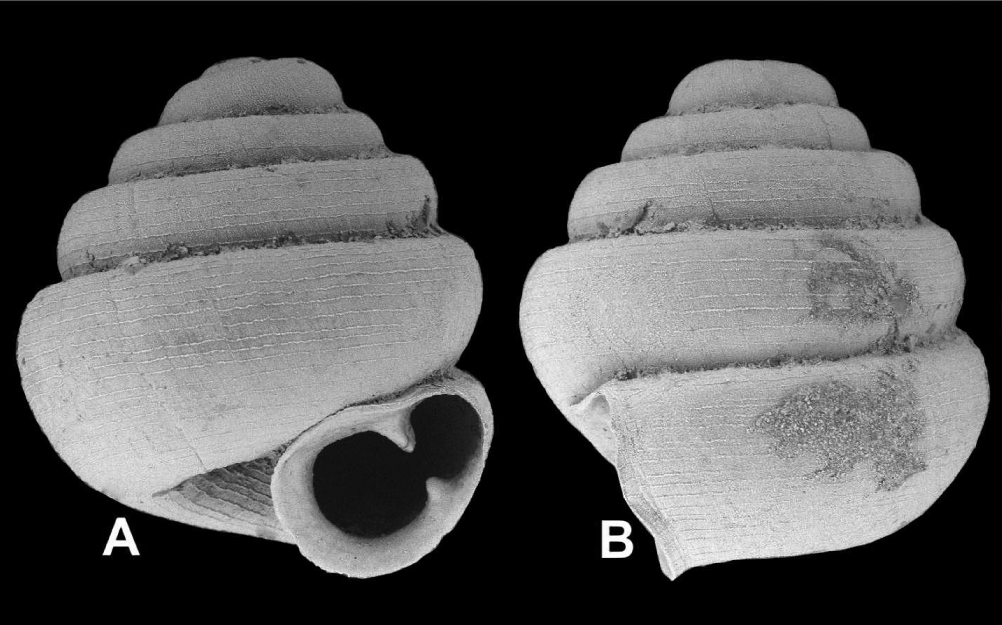
Angustopila dominikae

- Acmella cyrtoglyphe Vermeulen, Liew, & Schilthuizen, 2015
- Acmella nana Vermeulen, Liew, & Schilthuizen, 2015
- Acmella ovoidea Vermeulen, Liew, & Schilthuizen, 2015
- Acmella striata Vermeulen, Liew, & Schilthuizen, 2015
- Acmella subcancellata Vermeulen, Liew, & Schilthuizen, 2015
- Acmella umbilicata Vermeulen, Liew, & Schilthuizen, 2015
- Aegista hiroshifukudai Hirano, Kameda & Chiba, 2015
- Albinaria almae efthimia Nordsieck, 2015
- Albinaria arcadica occulta Nordsieck, 2015
- Albinaria beckmanni Nordsieck, 2015
- Albinaria brevicollis maltezana Nordsieck, 2015
- Albinaria buresi aoos Nordsieck, 2015
- Albinaria butoti kwanti Nordsieck, 2015
- Albinaria confusa principallifera Nordsieck, 2015
- Albinaria delvinensis Nordsieck, 2015
- Albinaria haussknechti mouzakiensis Nordsieck, 2015
- Albinaria nivea grossa Nordsieck, 2015
- Albinaria nivea reuselaarsi Nordsieck, 2015
- Albinaria schuetti miraptyx Nordsieck, 2015
- Albinaria schuetti serresensis Nordsieck, 2015
- Albinaria scopulosa acutispira Nordsieck, 2015
- Albinaria scopulosa echinarum Nordsieck, 2015
- Amphidromus globonevilli Sutcharit & Panha, 2015
- Amphidromus principalis Sutcharit & Panha, 2015
- Amphidromus psephos Vermeulen, Liew, & Schilthuizen, 2015
- Anaglyphula sauroderma Vermeulen, Liew, & Schilthuizen, 2015
- Angustopila dominikae Páll-Gergely & Hunyadi in Páll-Gergely, Hunyadi, Jochum & Asami, 2015
- Angustopila fabella Páll-Gergely & Hunyadi in Páll-Gergely, Hunyadi, Jochum & Asami, 2015
- Angustopila subelevata Páll-Gergely & Hunyadi in Páll-Gergely, Hunyadi, Jochum & Asami, 2015
- Angustopila szekeresi Páll-Gergely & Hunyadi in Páll-Gergely, Hunyadi, Jochum & Asami, 2015
- Boucardicus monchenkoi Balashov & Griffiths, 2015
- Boucardicus ambindaensis Balashov & Griffiths, 2015
- Boysidia jingpingensis Tian, Fang & Chen, 2015
- Boysidia qingliangfengensis Fang, Wang & Chen, 2015
- Bulgarica hemmenorum Nordsieck, 2015
- Chondrina feneriensis Bodon, Nardi, Cianfanelli & Kokshoorn, 2015
- Curvella hatrotes Vermeulen, Liew, & Schilthuizen, 2015
- Delima binotata grahovensis Nordsieck, 2015
- Delima montenegrina tarensis Nordsieck, 2015
- Diancta aurea Neubert & Bouchet, 2015
- Diancta aurita Neubert & Bouchet, 2015
- Diancta basiplana Neubert & Bouchet, 2015
- Diancta controversa Neubert & Bouchet, 2015
- Diancta densecostulata Neubert & Bouchet, 2015
- Diancta dextra Neubert & Bouchet, 2015
- Diancta dilatata Neubert & Bouchet, 2015
- Diancta distorta Neubert & Bouchet, 2015
- Diancta pulchella Neubert & Bouchet, 2015
- Diancta rotunda Neubert & Bouchet, 2015
- Diancta subquadrata Neubert & Bouchet, 2015
- Diancta trilamellata Neubert & Bouchet, 2015
- Diplommatina bidentata Vermeulen, Liew, & Schilthuizen, 2015
- Diplommatina nakashimai Minato, 2015
- Diplommatina tylocheilos Vermeulen, Liew, & Schilthuizen, 2015
- Ditropopsis cincta Vermeulen, Liew, & Schilthuizen, 2015
- Ditropopsis constricta Vermeulen, Liew, & Schilthuizen, 2015
- Ditropopsis davisoni Vermeulen, Liew, & Schilthuizen, 2015
- Ditropopsis trachychilus Vermeulen, Liew, & Schilthuizen, 2015
- Ditropopsis tyloacron Vermeulen, Liew, & Schilthuizen, 2015
- Drymaeus dakryodes Salvador, Cavallari & Simone, 2015
- 'Durgella' densestriata Vermeulen, Liew, & Schilthuizen, 2015
- Dyakia chlorosoma Vermeulen, Liew, & Schilthuizen, 2015
- Endothyrella angulata Budha & Páll-Gergely in Páll-Gergely, Budha, Naggs, Backeljau & Asami, 2015
- Endothyrella dolakhaensis Budha & Páll-Gergely in Páll-Gergely, Budha, Naggs, Backeljau & Asami, 2015
- Endothyrella inexpectata Páll-Gergely in Páll-Gergely, Budha, Naggs, Backeljau & Asami, 2015
- Endothyrella nepalica Budha & Páll-Gergely in Páll-Gergely, Budha, Naggs, Backeljau & Asami, 2015
- Endothyrella robustistriata Páll-Gergely in Páll-Gergely, Budha, Naggs, Backeljau & Asami, 2015
- Eostrobilops humicolus Páll-Gergely & Hunyadi in Páll-Gergely, Hunyadi & Asami, 2015
- Garnieria mouhoti nhuongi Do & Do, 2015
- Georissa leucococca Vermeulen, Liew, & Schilthuizen, 2015
- Georissa nephrostoma Vermeulen, Liew, & Schilthuizen, 2015
- Geotrochus kitteli Vermeulen, Liew, & Schilthuizen, 2015
- Geotrochus meristotrochus Vermeulen, Liew, & Schilthuizen, 2015
- Geotrochus oedobasis Vermeulen, Liew, & Schilthuizen, 2015
- Geotrochus scolops Vermeulen, Liew, & Schilthuizen, 2015
- Geotrochus spilokeiria Vermeulen, Liew, & Schilthuizen, 2015
- Geotrochus subscalaris Vermeulen, Liew, & Schilthuizen, 2015
- Gudeodiscus hemmeni Páll-Gergely & Hunyadi in Páll-Gergely, Hunyadi, Ablett, Lương, Naggs & Asami, 2015
- Gudeodiscus messageri raheemi Páll-Gergely & Hunyadi in Páll-Gergely, Hunyadi, Ablett, Lương, Naggs & Asami, 2015
- Helicostyla amagaensis de Chavez in de Chavez, Fontanilla, Batomalaque & Chiba, 2015
- Hungerfordia aspera Yamazaki & Ueshima in Yamazaki, Yamazaki, Rundell & Ueshima, 2015
- Hungerfordia angaurensis Yamazaki & Ueshima in Yamazaki, Yamazaki, & Ueshima, 2015
- Hungerfordia basodonta Yamazaki & Ueshima in Yamazaki, Yamazaki, & Ueshima, 2015
- Hungerfordia brachyptera Yamazaki & Ueshima in Yamazaki, Yamazaki, & Ueshima, 2015
- Hungerfordia chilorhytis Yamazaki & Ueshima in Yamazaki, Yamazaki, Rundell & Ueshima, 2015
- Hungerfordia crassilabris attenuata Yamazaki & Ueshima in Yamazaki, Yamazaki, & Ueshima, 2015
- Hungerfordia crassilabris tridentata Yamazaki & Ueshima in Yamazaki, Yamazaki, & Ueshima, 2015
- Hungerfordia crenata Yamazaki & Ueshima in Yamazaki, Yamazaki, & Ueshima, 2015
- Hungerfordia elegantissima anomphala Yamazaki & Ueshima in Yamazaki, Yamazaki, Rundell & Ueshima, 2015
- Hungerfordia eurystoma Yamazaki & Ueshima in Yamazaki, Yamazaki, & Ueshima, 2015
- Hungerfordia fragilipennis Yamazaki & Ueshima in Yamazaki, Yamazaki, Rundell & Ueshima, 2015
- Hungerfordia globosa Yamazaki & Ueshima in Yamazaki, Yamazaki, Rundell & Ueshima, 2015
- Hungerfordia goniobasis exserta Yamazaki & Ueshima in Yamazaki, Yamazaki, Rundell & Ueshima, 2015
- Hungerfordia irregularis Yamazaki & Ueshima in Yamazaki, Yamazaki, Rundell & Ueshima, 2015
- Hungerfordia longissima Yamazaki & Ueshima in Yamazaki, Yamazaki, & Ueshima, 2015
- Hungerfordia lutea hemilaevis Yamazaki & Ueshima in Yamazaki, Yamazaki, & Ueshima, 2015
- Hungerfordia loxodonta Yamazaki & Ueshima in Yamazaki, Yamazaki, & Ueshima, 2015
- Hungerfordia microbasodonta Yamazaki & Ueshima in Yamazaki, Yamazaki, & Ueshima, 2015
- Hungerfordia ngereamensis Yamazaki & Ueshima in Yamazaki, Yamazaki, Rundell & Ueshima, 2015
- Hungerfordia nodulosa Yamazaki & Ueshima in Yamazaki, Yamazaki, Rundell & Ueshima, 2015
- Hungerfordia omphaloptyx Yamazaki & Ueshima in Yamazaki, Yamazaki, & Ueshima, 2015
- Hungerfordia pyramis pteroma Yamazaki & Ueshima in Yamazaki, Yamazaki, & Ueshima, 2015
- Hungerfordia ringens rotundatus Yamazaki & Ueshima in Yamazaki, Yamazaki, & Ueshima, 2015
- Hungerfordia ringens ventrinodus Yamazaki & Ueshima in Yamazaki, Yamazaki, & Ueshima, 2015
- Hungerfordia robiginosa Yamazaki & Ueshima in Yamazaki, Yamazaki, & Ueshima, 2015
- Hungerfordia rudicostata Yamazaki & Ueshima in Yamazaki, Yamazaki, & Ueshima, 2015
- Hungerfordia spinoscapula Yamazaki & Ueshima in Yamazaki, Yamazaki, & Ueshima, 2015
- Hungerfordia spiroperculata Yamazaki & Ueshima in Yamazaki, Yamazaki, Rundell & Ueshima, 2015
- Hungerfordia unisulcata Yamazaki & Ueshima in Yamazaki, Yamazaki, & Ueshima, 2015
- Hypselostoma lacrima Páll-Gergely & Hunyadi in Páll-Gergely, Hunyadi, Jochum & Asami, 2015
- Hypselostoma socialis Páll-Gergely & Hunyadi in Páll-Gergely, Hunyadi, Jochum & Asami, 2015
- Japonia anceps Vermeulen, Liew, & Schilthuizen, 2015
- Kaliella eurytrochus Vermeulen, Liew, & Schilthuizen, 2015
- Kaliella microsoma Vermeulen, Liew, & Schilthuizen, 2015
- Kaliella phacomorpha Vermeulen, Liew, & Schilthuizen, 2015
- Kaliella punctata Vermeulen, Liew, & Schilthuizen, 2015
- Kaliella sublaxa Vermeulen, Liew, & Schilthuizen, 2015
- Kenyirus sheema Foon, Tan & Clements, 2015
- Kora nigra Simone, 2015
- Kora iracema Simone, 2015
- Kora terrea Simone, 2015
- Koreozospeum nodongense Lee, Prozorova & Jochum in Jochum, Prozorova, Sharyi-ool & Páll-Gergely, 2015
- Krobylos sinensis Páll-Gergely & Hunyadi in Páll-Gergely, Hunyadi, Jochum & Asami, 2015
- Leiostyla beatae Walther & Hausdorf, 2015
- Lilloiconcha lopezi Araya & Aliaga, 2015
- Microcystina callifera Vermeulen, Liew, & Schilthuizen, 2015
- Microcystina microrhynchus Vermeulen, Liew, & Schilthuizen, 2015
- Microcystina physotrochus Vermeulen, Liew, & Schilthuizen, 2015
- Microcystina planiuscula Vermeulen, Liew, & Schilthuizen, 2015
- Microcystina striatula Vermeulen, Liew, & Schilthuizen, 2015
- Moussonia acuta Neubert & Bouchet, 2015
- Moussonia barkeri Neubert & Bouchet, 2015
- Moussonia brodieae Neubert & Bouchet, 2015
- Moussonia longipalatalis Neubert & Bouchet, 2015
- Moussonia minutissima Neubert & Bouchet, 2015
- Moussonia obesa Neubert & Bouchet, 2015
- Moussonia polita Neubert & Bouchet, 2015
- Moussonia uncinata Neubert & Bouchet, 2015
- Moussonia vitianoides Neubert & Bouchet, 2015
- Palaina alberti Neubert & Bouchet, 2015
- Palaina flammulata Neubert & Bouchet, 2015
- Palaina glabella Neubert & Bouchet, 2015
- Palaina kitteli Neubert & Bouchet, 2015
- Palaina labeosa Neubert & Bouchet, 2015
- Palaina parietalis Neubert & Bouchet, 2015
- Palaina sulcata Neubert & Bouchet, 2015
- Palaina truncata Neubert & Bouchet, 2015
- Palaina tuberosissima Neubert & Bouchet, 2015
- Pallidelix simonhudsoni Stanisic, 2015
- Paralaoma angusta Vermeulen, Liew, & Schilthuizen, 2015
- Pearsonia lamphunensis Tumpeesuwan & Tumpeesuwan, 2015
- Philalanka anomphala Vermeulen, Liew, & Schilthuizen, 2015
- Philalanka malimgunung Vermeulen, Liew, & Schilthuizen, 2015
- Philalanka obscura Vermeulen, Liew, & Schilthuizen, 2015
- Philalanka rugulosa Vermeulen, Liew, & Schilthuizen, 2015
- Philalanka tambunanensis Vermeulen, Liew, & Schilthuizen, 2015
- Plectorhagada teres Taylor, Johnson & Stankowski, 2015
- Plekocheilus cecepeus Breure & Araujo, 2015
- Pseudopomatias abletti Páll-Gergely in Páll-Gergely, Fehér, Hunyadi & Asami, 2015
- Pseudopomatias harli Páll-Gergely in Páll-Gergely, Fehér, Hunyadi & Asami, 2015
- Pseudopomatias lianprietoae Páll-Gergely in Páll-Gergely, Fehér, Hunyadi & Asami, 2015
- Pseudopomatias maasseni Páll-Gergely & Hunyadi in Páll-Gergely, Fehér, Hunyadi & Asami, 2015
- Pseudopomatias nitens Páll-Gergely in Páll-Gergely, Fehér, Hunyadi & Asami, 2015
- Pseudopomatias prestoni Páll-Gergely in Páll-Gergely, Fehér, Hunyadi & Asami, 2015
- Pseudopomatias reischuetzi Páll-Gergely in Páll-Gergely, Fehér, Hunyadi & Asami, 2015
- Pseudopomatias shanensis Páll-Gergely in Páll-Gergely, Fehér, Hunyadi & Asami, 2015
- Pseudopomatias sophiae Páll-Gergely in Páll-Gergely, Fehér, Hunyadi & Asami, 2015
- Rahula delopleura Vermeulen, Liew, & Schilthuizen, 2015
- Rhagada karajarri Burghardt & Köhler, 2015
- Rhagada worora Burghardt & Köhler, 2015
- Satsuma akiratadai Kameda & Fukuda, 2015
- Setocallosa pathutchingsae Criscione & Köhler, 2015
- Siciliaria pantocratoris epapillata Nordsieck, 2015
- Siciliaria pantocratoris loutrana Nordsieck, 2015
- Sinoennea copiaensis Do & Do, 2015
- Sinoennea loeiensis Tanmuangpak & Tumpeesuwan in Tanmuangpak, Dumrongrojwattana, Tumpeesuwan & Tumpeesuwan, 2015
- Sinoennea menglungensis Wang, Chen, Zhou & Hwang, 2015
- Solaropsis alcobacensis Salvador & Simone, 2015
- Stemmatopsis nangphaiensis Do & Do, 2015
- Stemmatopsis vanhoensis Do & Do, 2015
- Strepsitaurus manduensis Taylor, Johnson & Stankowski, 2015
- Strepsitaurus susieae Taylor, Johnson & Stankowski, 2015
- Strigilodelima conspersa subaii Nordsieck, 2015
- Taiwanassiminea phantasma Hallan & Fukuda, 2015
- Trachia serpentinitica Vermeulen, Liew, & Schilthuizen, 2015
- Triodopsis juxtidens robinae Hotopp, 2015
- Trochomorpha haptoderma Vermeulen, Liew, & Schilthuizen, 2015
- Trochomorpha thelecoryphe Vermeulen, Liew, & Schilthuizen, 2015
- Trochomorpha trachus Vermeulen, Liew, & Schilthuizen, 2015
- Vargapupa biheli Páll-Gergely in Páll-Gergely, Fehér, Hunyadi & Asami, 2015
- Vargapupa oharai Páll-Gergely in Páll-Gergely, Fehér, Hunyadi & Asami, 2015
- Vitrea politissima Páll-Gergely in Páll-Gergely & Asami, 2015
- Zospeum vasconicum Prieto, De Winter, Weigand, Gómez & Jochum in Jochum, De Winter, Weigand, Gómez & Prieto, 2015
- Zospeum zaldivarae Prieto, De Winter, Weigand, Gómez & Jochum in Jochum, De Winter, Weigand, Gómez & Prieto, 2015

== See also ==
- List of gastropods described in 2014
- List of gastropods described in 2016
