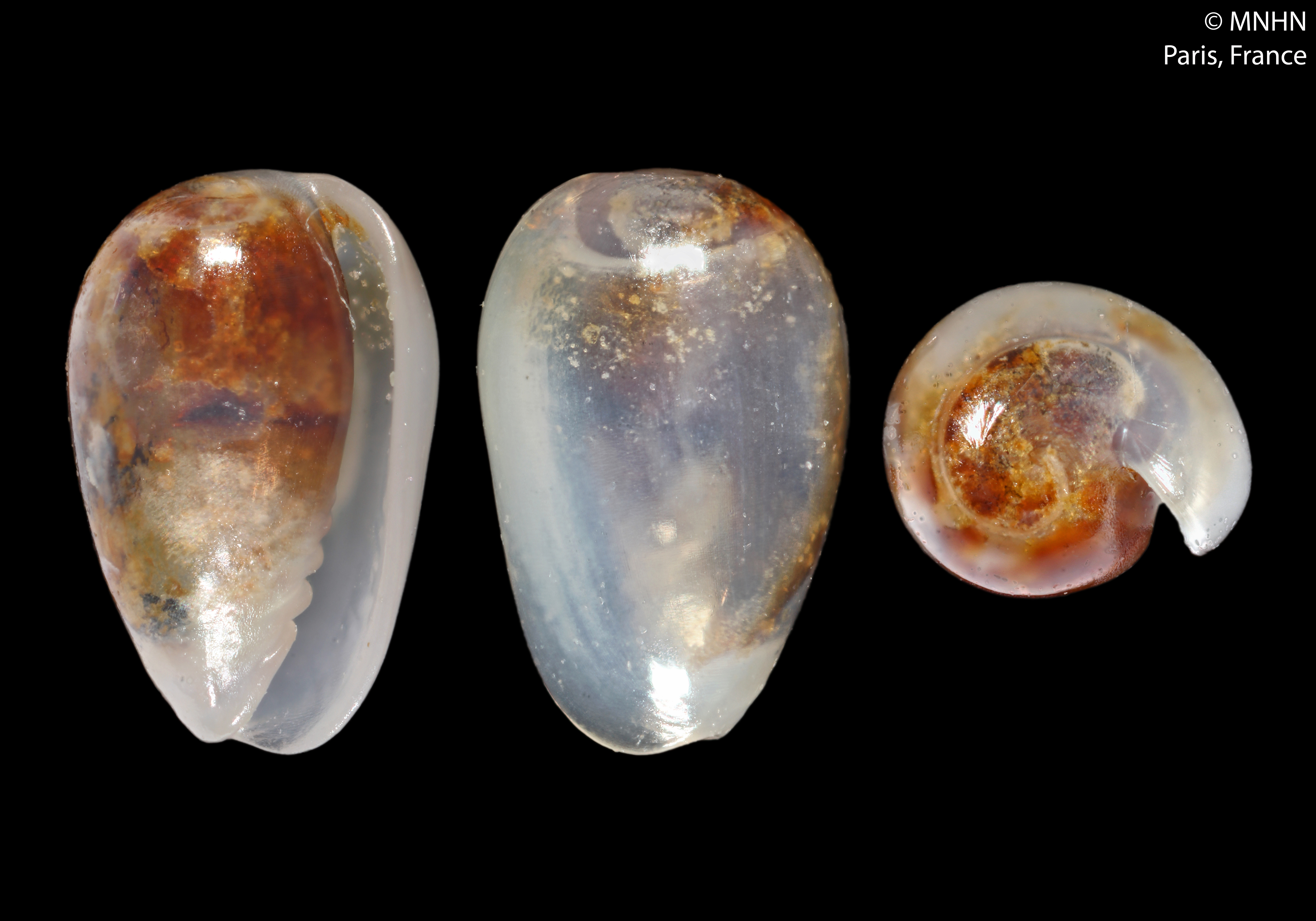
- Shell of Gibberula atwoodae (holotype at MNHN, Paris)

Scientific classification
- Kingdom: Animalia
- Phylum: Mollusca
- Class: Gastropoda
- Subclass: Caenogastropoda
- Order: Neogastropoda
- Family: Cystiscidae
- Subfamily: Cystiscinae
- Genus: Gibberula
- Species: G. atwoodae

Binomial name
- Gibberula atwoodae Ortea, 2015

= Gibberula atwoodae =

Species of gastropod

Gibberula atwoodae is a species of sea snail, a marine gastropod mollusk, in the family Cystiscidae. It is named after Canadian writer Margaret Atwood.

== Description ==
The length of the shell attains 2.65 mm.

== Distribution ==
This species occurs in Guadeloupe.
