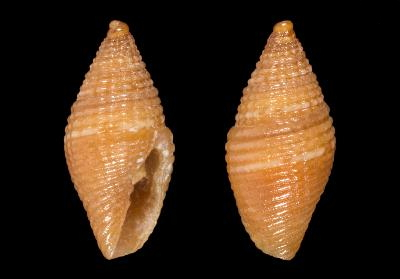
- Shell of Mitromorpha mariottinii (holotype in the MNHN, Paris)

Scientific classification
- Kingdom: Animalia
- Phylum: Mollusca
- Class: Gastropoda
- Subclass: Caenogastropoda
- Order: Neogastropoda
- Superfamily: Conoidea
- Family: Mitromorphidae
- Genus: Mitromorpha
- Species: M. mariottinii

Binomial name
- Mitromorpha mariottinii Amati, Smriglio & Oliverio, 2015

Synonyms
- Mitromorpha (Mitrolumna) mariottinii Amati, Smriglio & Oliverio, 2015

= Mitromorpha mariottinii =

Species of gastropod

Mitromorpha mariottinii is a species of sea snail, a marine gastropod mollusk in the family Mitromorphidae.

== Description ==
The length of the shell varies between 5 mm and 7 mm.

== Distribution ==
This marine species occurs in the Tyrrhenian Sea, Italy.
