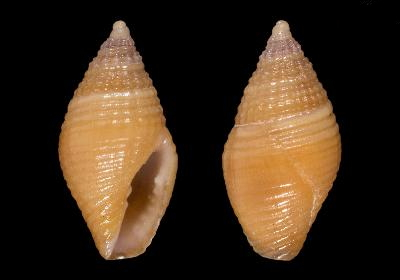
- Shell of Mitromorpha tricolorata (holotype in the MNHN, Paris)

Scientific classification
- Kingdom: Animalia
- Phylum: Mollusca
- Class: Gastropoda
- Subclass: Caenogastropoda
- Order: Neogastropoda
- Superfamily: Conoidea
- Family: Mitromorphidae
- Genus: Mitromorpha
- Species: M. tricolorata

Binomial name
- Mitromorpha tricolorata Amati, Smriglio & Oliverio, 2015

Synonyms
- Mitromorpha (Mitrolumna) tricolorata Amati, Smriglio & Oliverio, 2015

= Mitromorpha tricolorata =

Species of gastropod

Mitromorpha tricolorata is a species of sea snail, a marine gastropod mollusk in the family Mitromorphidae.

== Description ==
The length of the shell attains 5.7 mm.

== Distribution ==
This marine species occurs in the Central Mediterranean Sea.
