= Volvarina abdieli =

Scientific classification
- Kingdom: Animalia
- Phylum: Mollusca
- Class: Gastropoda
- Subclass: Caenogastropoda
- Order: Neogastropoda
- Family: Marginellidae
- Genus: Volvarina
- Species: V. abdieli

Binomial name
- Volvarina abdieli Espinosa, Ortea & Diez, 2015

Species of gastropod

Volvarina abdieli is a species of sea snail, a marine gastropod mollusk in the family Marginellidae, the margin snails.

== Distribution ==
This marine species occurs off Cuba, Caribbean Sea.
