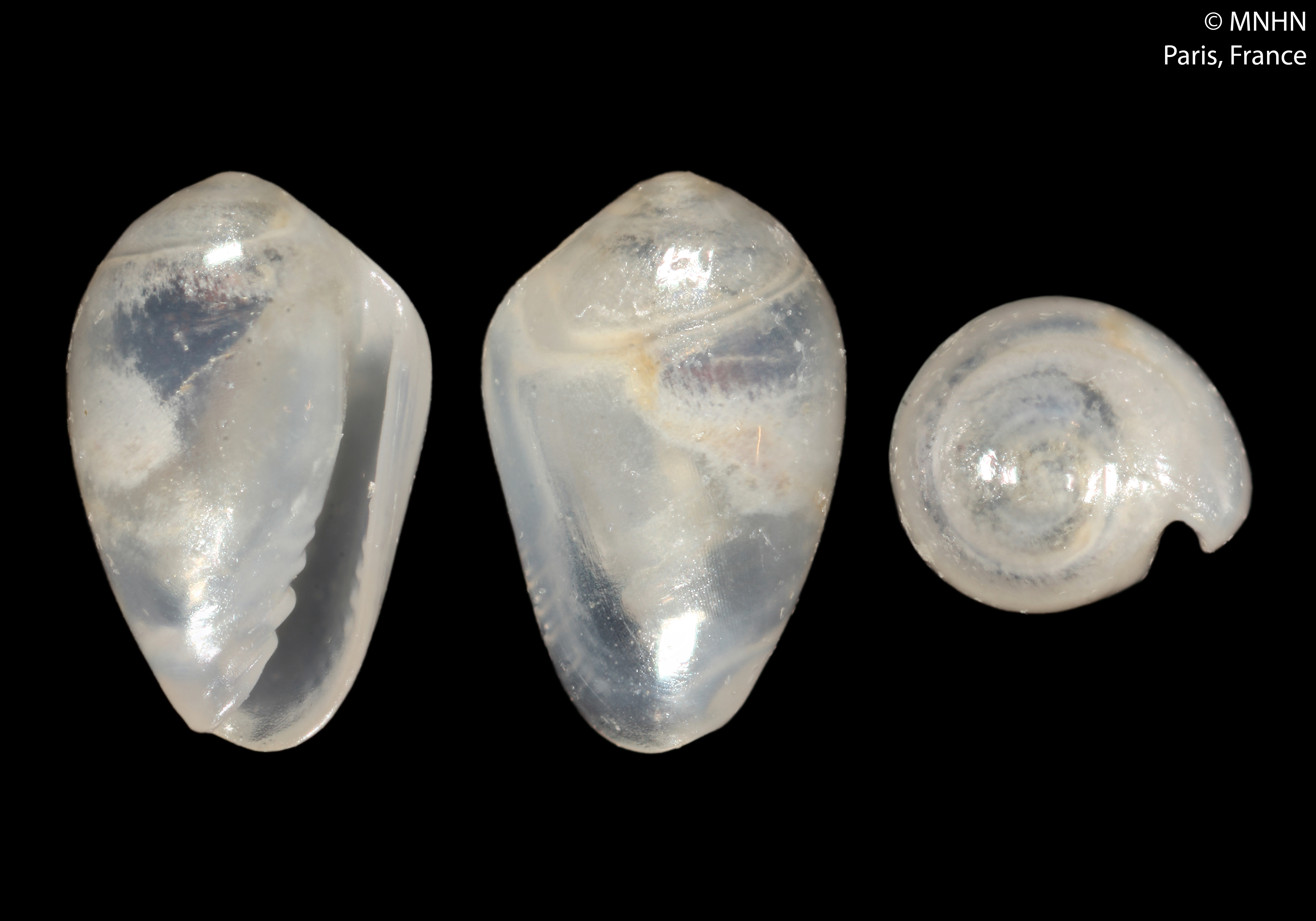
- Shell of Gibberula sassenae (holotype at MNHN, Paris)

Scientific classification
- Kingdom: Animalia
- Phylum: Mollusca
- Class: Gastropoda
- Subclass: Caenogastropoda
- Order: Neogastropoda
- Family: Cystiscidae
- Subfamily: Cystiscinae
- Genus: Gibberula
- Species: G. sassenae

Binomial name
- Gibberula sassenae Ortea, 2015

= Gibberula sassenae =

Species of gastropod

Gibberula sassenae is a species of sea snail, a marine gastropod mollusk, in the family Cystiscidae. It is named after Dutch-American sociologist Saskia Sassen.

== Description ==
The length of the shell attains 2.39 mm.

Their functional type is benthos.

Their feeding type is predatory.

== Distribution ==
This marine species occurs off Guadeloupe.
