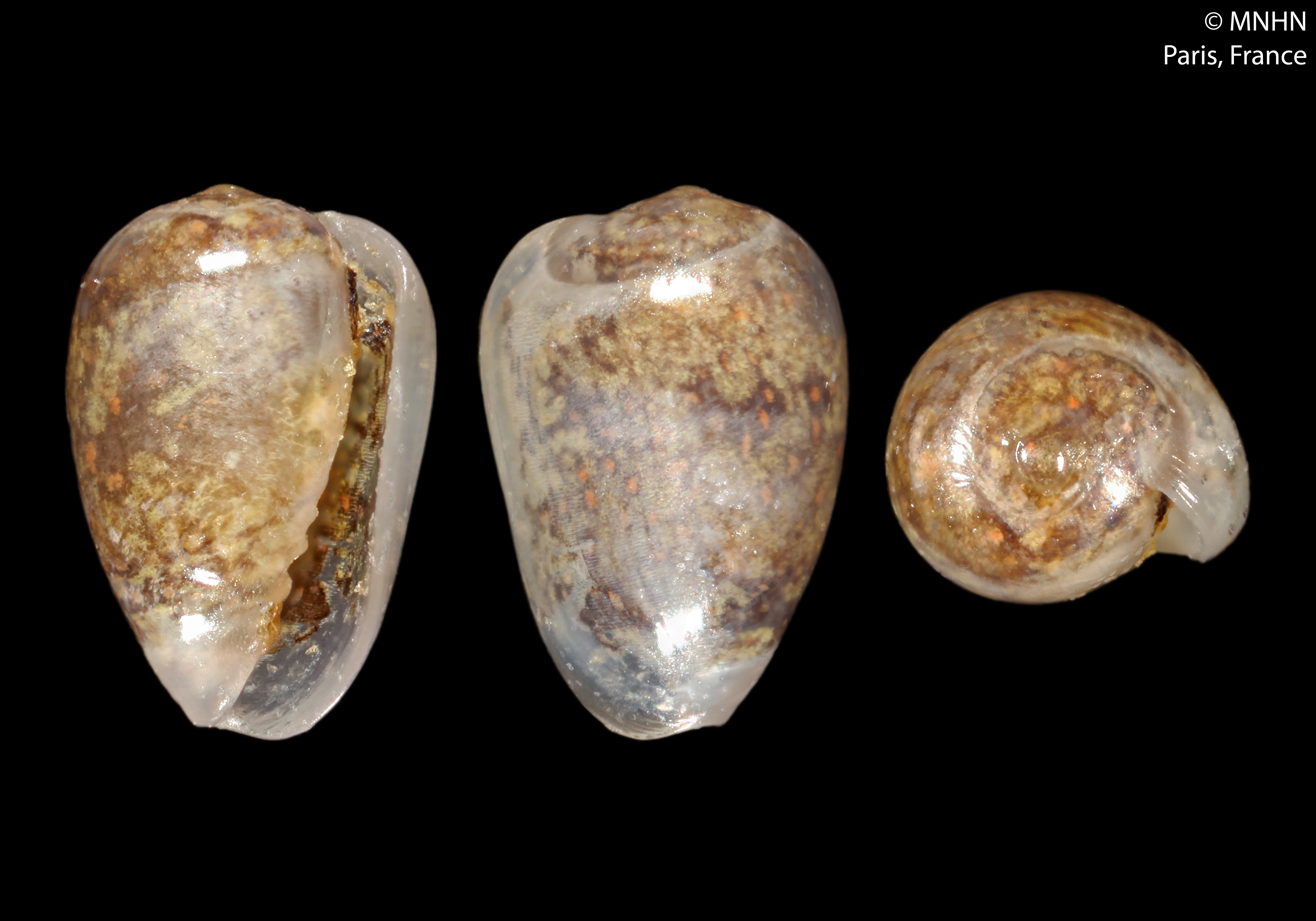
- Shell of Gibberula betancourtae (holotype at MNHN, Paris)

Scientific classification
- Kingdom: Animalia
- Phylum: Mollusca
- Class: Gastropoda
- Subclass: Caenogastropoda
- Order: Neogastropoda
- Family: Cystiscidae
- Subfamily: Cystiscinae
- Genus: Gibberula
- Species: G. betancourtae

Binomial name
- Gibberula betancourtae Ortea, 2015

= Gibberula betancourtae =

Species of gastropod

Gibberula betancourtae is a species of sea snail, a marine gastropod mollusk, in the family Cystiscidae. It is named after Colombian politician Íngrid Betancourt.

== Description ==
The length of the shell attains 1.9 mm.

Its functional type is Benthos.

Its feeding type is predatory.

== Distribution ==
This species occurs off Guadeloupe.
