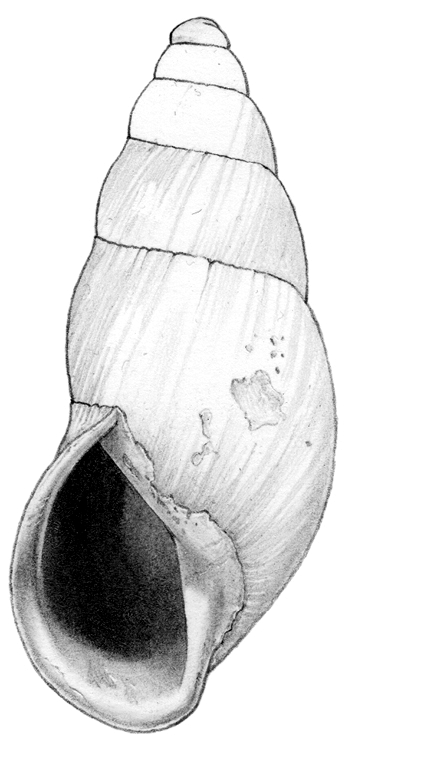
- Shell of Amphidromus psephos (holotype)

Scientific classification
- Kingdom: Animalia
- Phylum: Mollusca
- Class: Gastropoda
- Order: Stylommatophora
- Family: Camaenidae
- Genus: Amphidromus
- Species: A. psephos

Binomial name
- Amphidromus psephos Vermeulen, T.-S. Liew & Schilthuizen, 2015

= Amphidromus psephos =

Species of tree snail

Amphidromus psephos is a species of air-breathing tree snail, an arboreal gastropod mollusk in the family Camaenidae.

== Description ==
The length of this shell varies between 24 mm and 25 mm; its diameter is between 11 mm and 12 mm.

== Distribution ==
This species is endemic to Sabah, Borneo.
