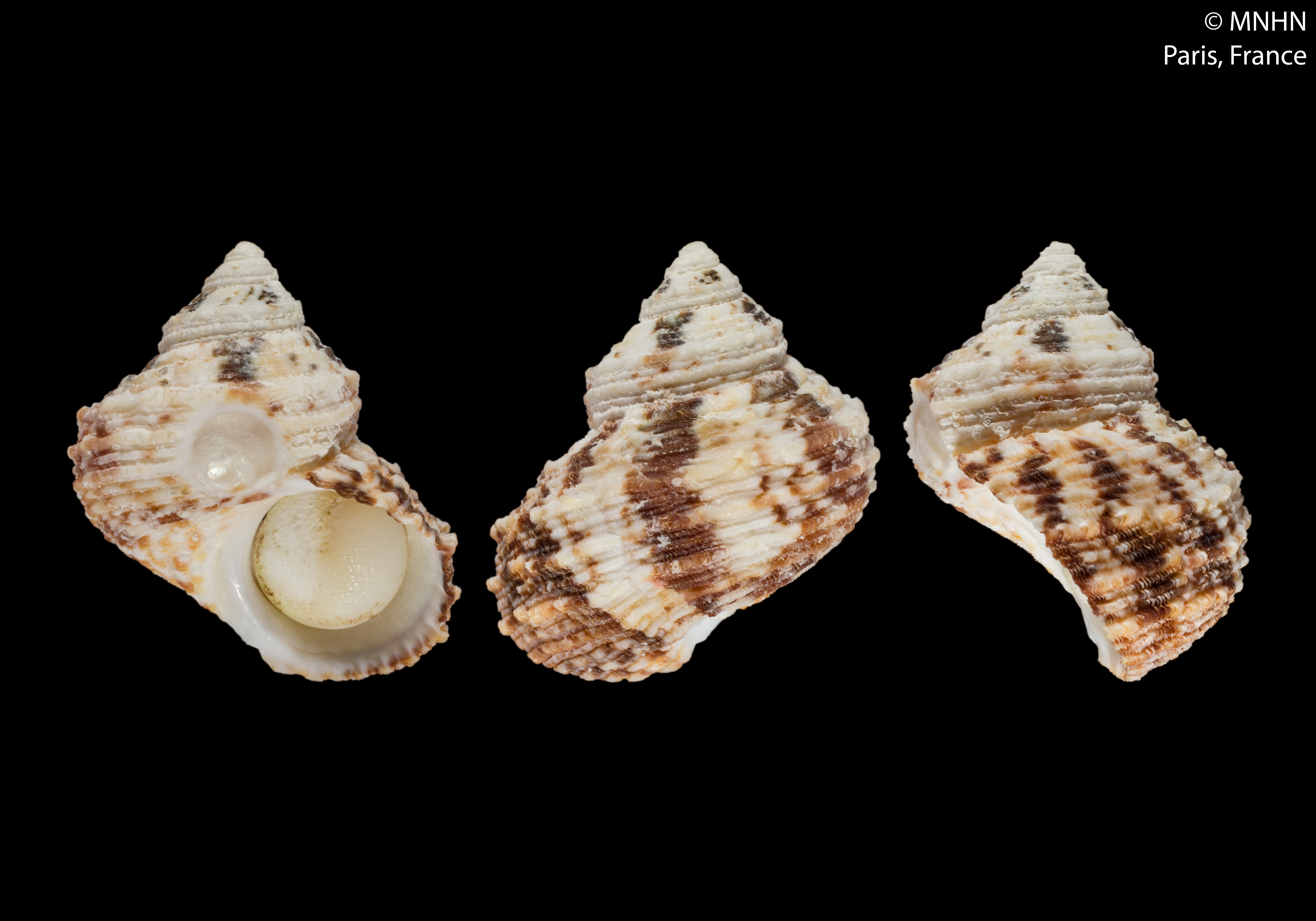
- Shell of Turbo lorenzi (holotype at MNHN, Paris)

Scientific classification
- Kingdom: Animalia
- Phylum: Mollusca
- Class: Gastropoda
- Subclass: Vetigastropoda
- Order: Trochida
- Superfamily: Trochoidea
- Family: Turbinidae
- Genus: Turbo
- Species: T. lorenzi

Binomial name
- Turbo lorenzi Alf & Kreipl, 2015

Synonyms
- Turbo (Aspilaturbo) lorenzi Alf & Kreipl, 2015

= Turbo lorenzi =

Species of gastropod

Turbo lorenzi is a species of sea snail, a marine gastropod mollusk, in the family Turbinidae, the turban snails.

== Description ==
Turbo lorenzi is a type of sea snail with a large, robust shell that is typically white to cream in color, with faint brown or orange spiral bands. The apex of the shell is white, and the operculum is white with tubercles all over it. Turbo lorenzi is similar to Turbo radiatus, but has a few key differences, such as the operculum, apex, and size and shape of the shell. The length of the shell attains 33.1 mm approximately.

== Distribution ==
This species in the Indian Ocean off Mauritius.
