= Volvarina irisae =

Scientific classification
- Kingdom: Animalia
- Phylum: Mollusca
- Class: Gastropoda
- Subclass: Caenogastropoda
- Order: Neogastropoda
- Family: Marginellidae
- Subfamily: Marginellinae
- Genus: Volvarina
- Species: V. irisae

Binomial name
- Volvarina irisae Espinosa & Ortea, 2015

Species of gastropod

Volvarina irisae is a species of sea snail, a marine gastropod mollusk in the family Marginellidae, the margin snails.

== Distribution ==
This marine species occurs in the Caribbean Sea off Cuba.
