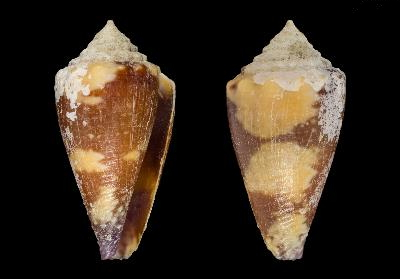
- Shells of Conus hughmorrisoni (holotype in MNHN, Paris)

Scientific classification
- Kingdom: Animalia
- Phylum: Mollusca
- Class: Gastropoda
- Subclass: Caenogastropoda
- Order: Neogastropoda
- Superfamily: Conoidea
- Family: Conidae
- Genus: Conus
- Species: C. hughmorrisoni

Binomial name
- Conus hughmorrisoni Lorenz & Puillandre, 2015

Synonyms
- Conus (Splinoconus) hughmorrisoni Lorenz & Puillandre, 2015 · accepted, alternate representation

= Conus hughmorrisoni =

Species of sea snail

Conus hughmorrisoni is a species of sea snail, a marine gastropod mollusc in the family Conidae, the cone snails, cone shells or cones.

Like all members of the family Conidae, these snails are predatory and venomous, and are capable of stinging humans.

== Description ==
The size of the shell varies between 10 mm and 21 mm (0.39–0.83 in).

The shell is small and light. The holotype measures 20.4mm. The holotype (catalogue number MNHN-IM-2013-53462) is deposited in the collections of the Muséum national d’Histoire naturelle, Paris. The spire is acute, having acute shoulders with a very gently concave profile. The suture is narrow and shallow. The last whorl is moderately wide and conical. The aperture is narrow. Both last adult whorl and penultimate whorls have 15-17 prominent tubercles on the shoulders. The interstices are well impressed. The teleoconch is white with areas of purple on the last whorl. The end of the whorl has a dark purple stain. The spire is generally white but may be marked with distinct brown axial lines. The last adult whorl has irregular patches of brown. There is an area of pale purple along the centre of the dorsal side. Some have the last adult whorl completely purplish. There can be quite a variation between individuals.

== Distribution ==
This marine species was collected from the Kavieng Lagoon of eastern part of Wadei Island and from the northwest point of Ungan Island, at depths of around 3-12 m on sandy/rubble substrates in New Ireland, Papua New Guinea.
