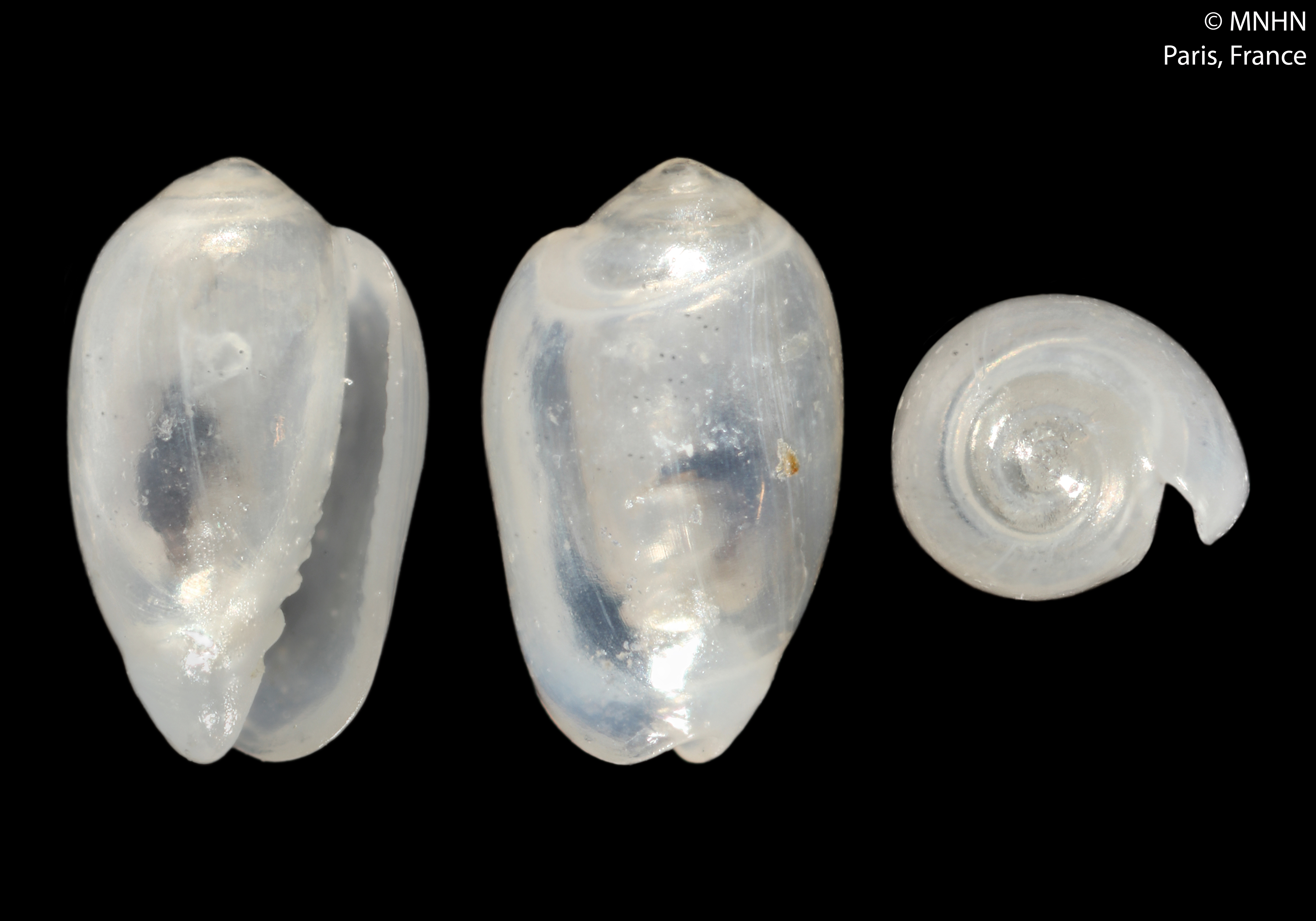
- Shell of Gibberula robinsonae (holotype at MNHN, Paris)

Scientific classification
- Kingdom: Animalia
- Phylum: Mollusca
- Class: Gastropoda
- Subclass: Caenogastropoda
- Order: Neogastropoda
- Family: Cystiscidae
- Subfamily: Cystiscinae
- Genus: Gibberula
- Species: G. robinsonae

Binomial name
- Gibberula robinsonae Ortea, 2015

= Gibberula robinsonae =

Species of gastropod

Gibberula robinsonae is a species of sea snail, a marine gastropod mollusk in the family Cystiscidae.

== Description ==
The length of the shell attains 2.5 mm.

== Distribution ==
This marine species occurs in Guadeloupe.
