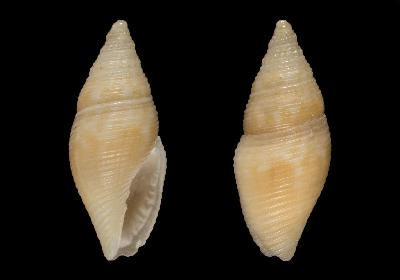
- Shell of Mitromorpha cossyrae (holotype in the MNHN, Paris)

Scientific classification
- Kingdom: Animalia
- Phylum: Mollusca
- Class: Gastropoda
- Subclass: Caenogastropoda
- Order: Neogastropoda
- Superfamily: Conoidea
- Family: Mitromorphidae
- Genus: Mitromorpha
- Species: M. cossyrae

Binomial name
- Mitromorpha cossyrae Amati, Smriglio & Oliverio, 2015

Synonyms
- Mitromorpha (Mitrolumna) cossyrae Amati, Smriglio & Oliverio, 2015

= Mitromorpha cossyrae =

Species of gastropod

Mitromorpha cossyrae is a species of sea snail, a marine gastropod mollusk in the family Mitromorphidae.

== Description ==
The length of the shell attains 8 mm.

== Distribution ==
This marine species occurs off the Pantelleria Island, Strait of Sicily, Mediterranean Sea.
