= Vexillum croceostoma =

Scientific classification
- Kingdom: Animalia
- Phylum: Mollusca
- Class: Gastropoda
- Subclass: Caenogastropoda
- Order: Neogastropoda
- Superfamily: Turbinelloidea
- Family: Costellariidae
- Genus: Vexillum
- Species: V. croceostoma

Binomial name
- Vexillum croceostoma Marrow, 2015

Synonyms
- Vexillum (Vexillum) croceostoma Marrow, 2015

Species of gastropod

Vexillum croceostoma is a species of sea snail, a marine gastropod mollusk, in the family Costellariidae, the ribbed miters.

== Description ==
The length of the shell attains 38 mm.

== Distribution ==
This marine species is endemic to Australia and occurs off North West Australia.
