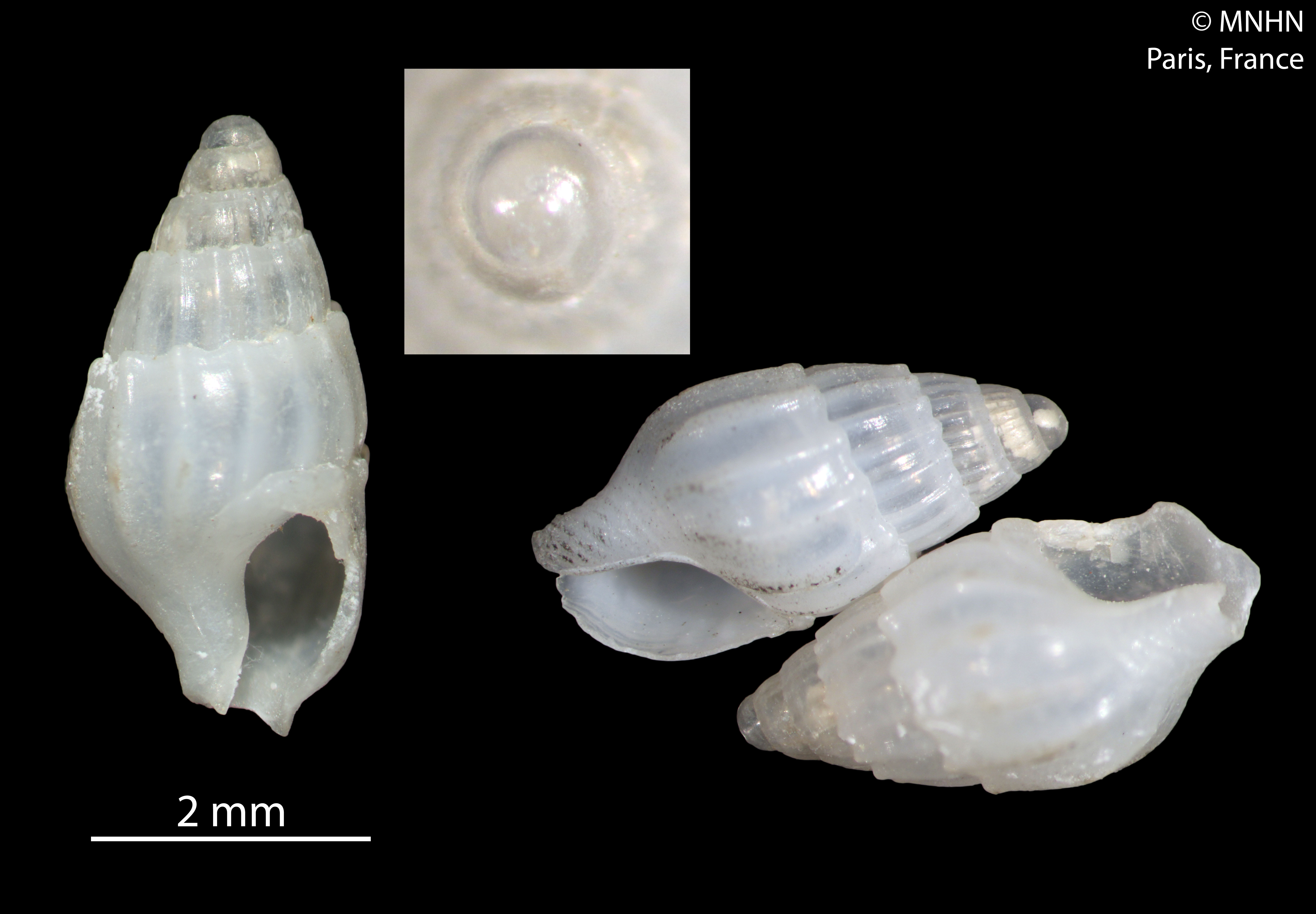
- Shell of Anachis rechonchuda (paratype at MNHN, Paris)

Scientific classification
- Kingdom: Animalia
- Phylum: Mollusca
- Class: Gastropoda
- Subclass: Caenogastropoda
- Order: Neogastropoda
- Family: Columbellidae
- Genus: Anachis
- Species: A. rechonchuda

Binomial name
- Anachis rechonchuda S. Lima & Guimarães, 2015

= Anachis rechonchuda =

Species of gastropod

Anachis rechonchuda is a species of sea snail in the family Columbellidae, the dove snails.

== Distribution ==
This species occurs in the Atlantic Ocean off Brazil.
