= Gibberula martingaiteae =

Scientific classification
- Kingdom: Animalia
- Phylum: Mollusca
- Class: Gastropoda
- Subclass: Caenogastropoda
- Order: Neogastropoda
- Family: Cystiscidae
- Subfamily: Cystiscinae
- Genus: Gibberula
- Species: G. martingaiteae

Binomial name
- Gibberula martingaiteae Ortea, 2015

Species of gastropod

Gibberula martingaiteae is a species of sea snail, a marine gastropod mollusk, in the family Cystiscidae. It is named after Spanish writer Carmen Martín Gaite.

== Distribution ==
This species occurs in Guadeloupe.
