= Gibberula diplostreptus =

Scientific classification
- Kingdom: Animalia
- Phylum: Mollusca
- Class: Gastropoda
- Subclass: Caenogastropoda
- Order: Neogastropoda
- Family: Cystiscidae
- Subfamily: Cystiscinae
- Genus: Gibberula
- Species: G. diplostreptus

Binomial name
- Gibberula diplostreptus (May, 1915)

Synonyms
- Marginella biplicata Tate & May, 1900; Marginella diplostreptus May, 1915

Species of gastropod

Gibberula diplostreptus is a species of sea snail, a marine gastropod mollusk, in the family Cystiscidae.
