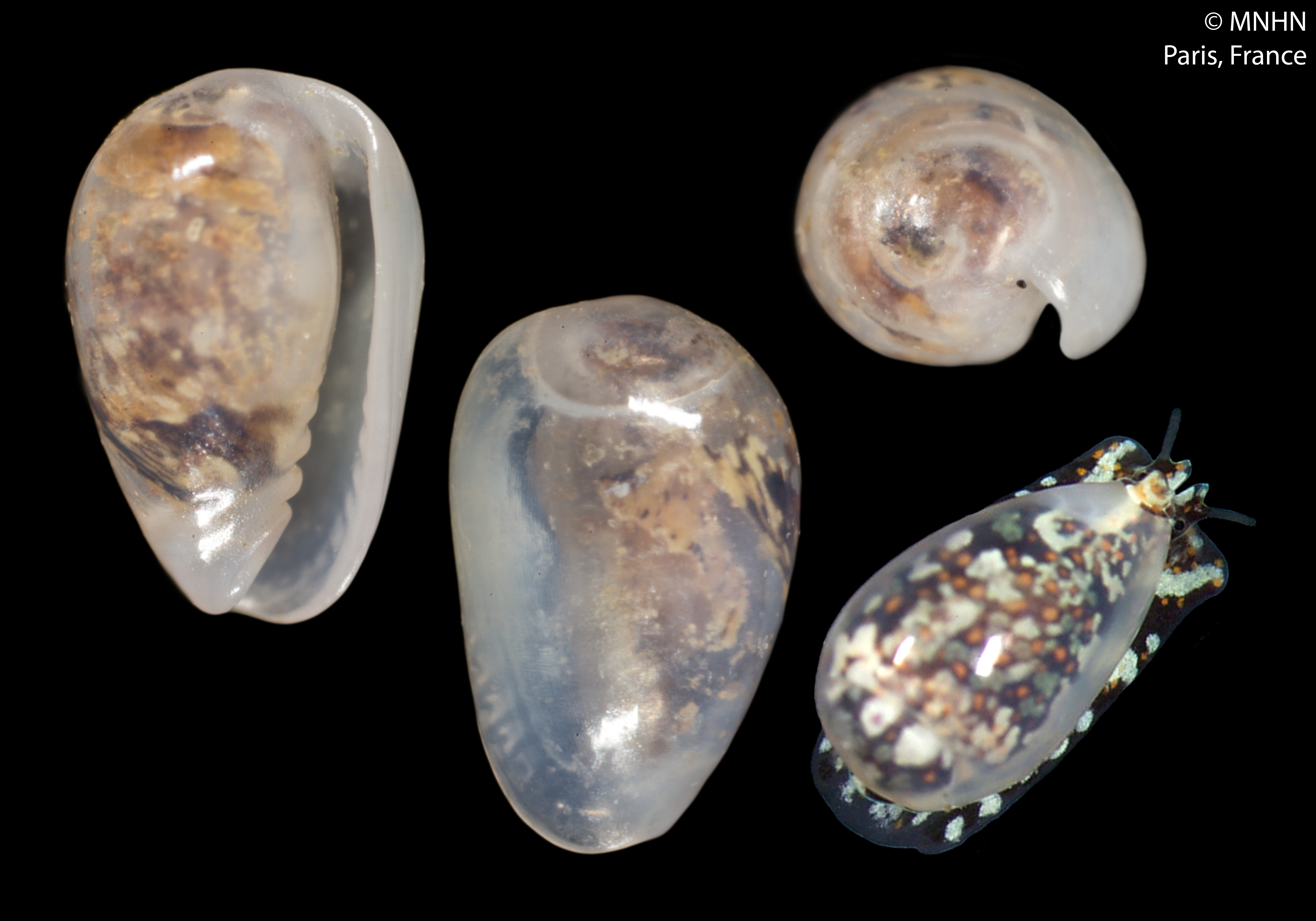
- Shell of Gibberula farlensis (holotype at MNHN, Paris)

Scientific classification
- Kingdom: Animalia
- Phylum: Mollusca
- Class: Gastropoda
- Subclass: Caenogastropoda
- Order: Neogastropoda
- Family: Cystiscidae
- Subfamily: Cystiscinae
- Genus: Gibberula
- Species: G. farlensis

Binomial name
- Gibberula farlensis McCleery, 2009

= Gibberula farlensis =

Species of gastropod

Gibberula farlensis is a species of very small sea snail, a marine gastropod mollusk or micromollusk in the family Cystiscidae.

== Description ==
The length of the shell attains 2.26 mm.

== Distribution ==
This marine species occurs in the Caribbean Sea off Belize.
