= Inbiocystiscus tanialeonae =

Scientific classification
- Kingdom: Animalia
- Phylum: Mollusca
- Class: Gastropoda
- Subclass: Caenogastropoda
- Order: Neogastropoda
- Family: Cystiscidae
- Subfamily: Cystiscinae
- Genus: Inbiocystiscus
- Species: I. tanialeonae

Binomial name
- Inbiocystiscus tanialeonae Ortea & Espinosa, 2016

Species of gastropod

Inbiocystiscus tanialeonae is a species of very small sea snail, a marine gastropod mollusk or micromollusk in the family Cystiscidae.

== Distribution ==
This marine species occurs off Guadeloupe. It is named after Cuban conductor and composer Tania León.
