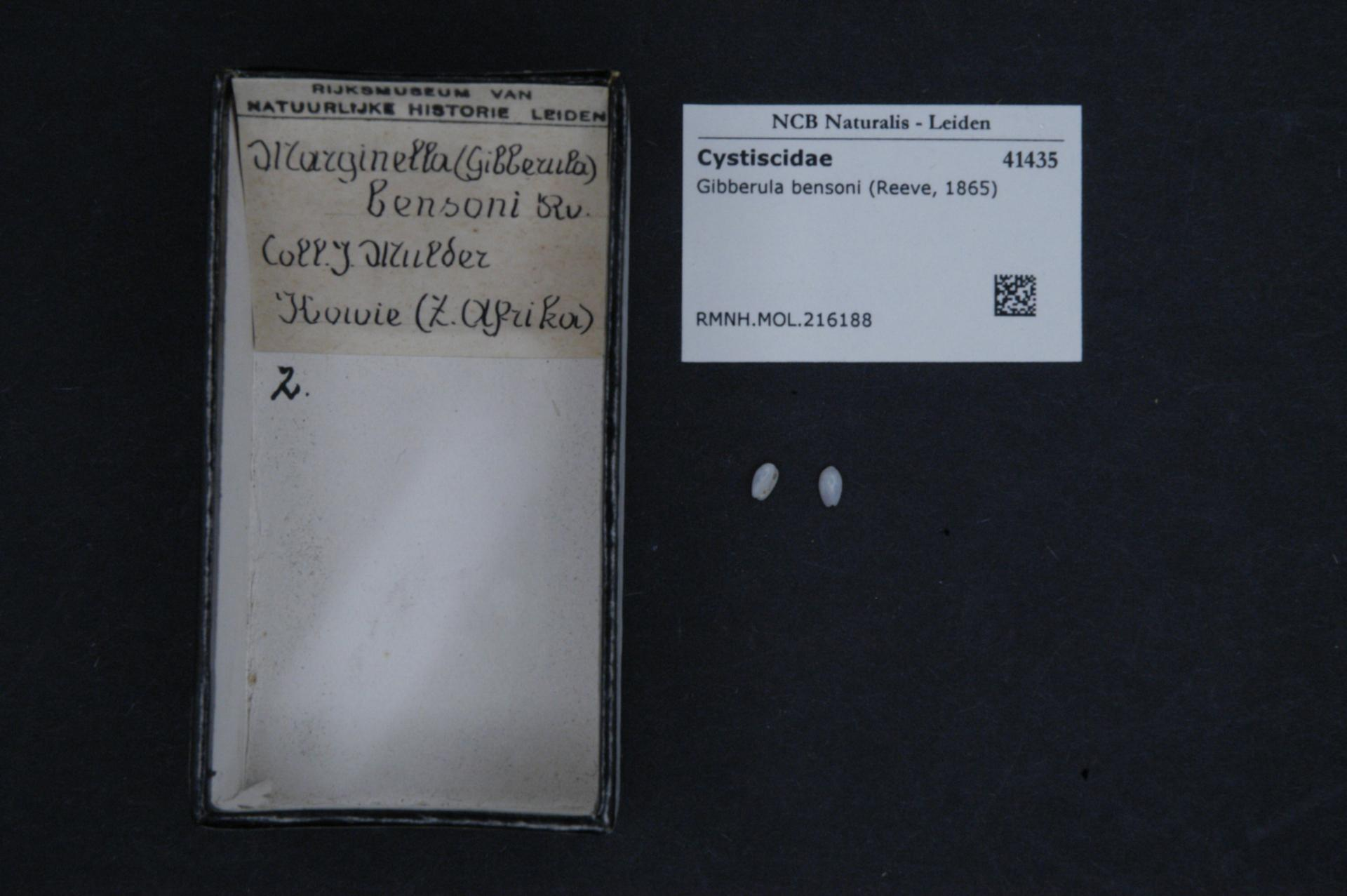
- Gibberula bensoni (Reeve, 1865)

Scientific classification
- Kingdom: Animalia
- Phylum: Mollusca
- Class: Gastropoda
- Subclass: Caenogastropoda
- Order: Neogastropoda
- Family: Cystiscidae
- Subfamily: Cystiscinae
- Genus: Gibberula
- Species: G. bensoni

Binomial name
- Gibberula bensoni (Reeve, 1865)

Synonyms
- Granula bensoni (Reeve, 1865); Marginella bensoni Reeve, 1865

= Gibberula bensoni =

Species of gastropod

Gibberula bensoni is a species of sea snail, a marine gastropod mollusk, in the family Cystiscidae.
