= Gibberula encaustica =

Scientific classification
- Kingdom: Animalia
- Phylum: Mollusca
- Class: Gastropoda
- Subclass: Caenogastropoda
- Order: Neogastropoda
- Family: Cystiscidae
- Subfamily: Cystiscinae
- Genus: Gibberula
- Species: G. encaustica

Binomial name
- Gibberula encaustica (Reeve, 1865)

Synonyms
- Marginella encaustica Reeve, 1865

Species of gastropod

Gibberula epigrus is a species of very small sea snail, a marine gastropod mollusk or micromollusk in the family Cystiscidae. It is regarded as a taxon inquirendum.
