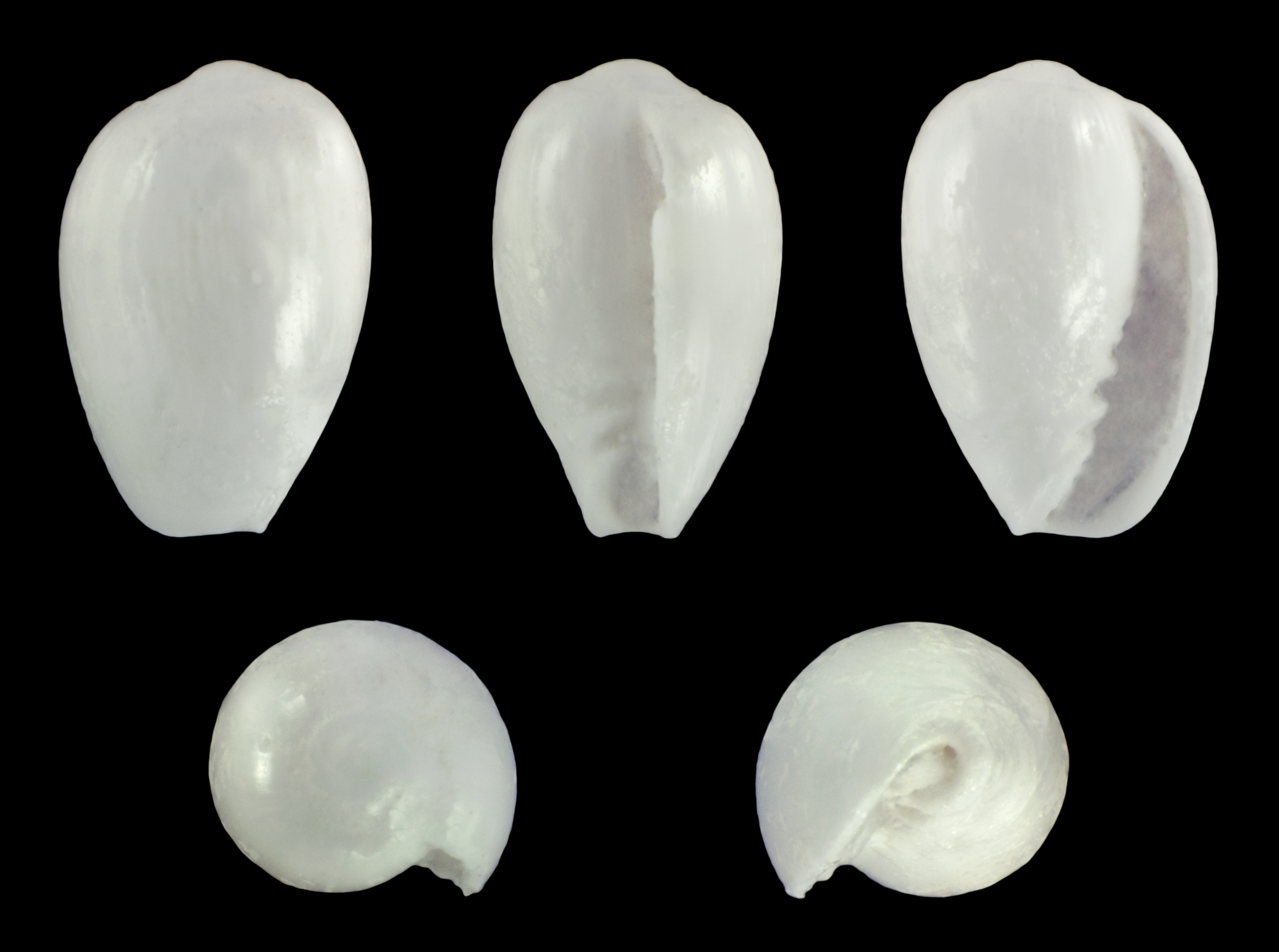

Scientific classification
- Kingdom: Animalia
- Phylum: Mollusca
- Class: Gastropoda
- Subclass: Caenogastropoda
- Order: Neogastropoda
- Family: Cystiscidae
- Subfamily: Cystiscinae
- Genus: Gibberula
- Species: G. lavalleeana

Binomial name
- Gibberula lavalleeana (d'Orbigny, 1842)

Synonyms
- Marginella lavalleeana d'Orbigny, 1842

= Gibberula lavalleeana =

Species of gastropod

Gibberula lavalleeana is a species of very small sea snail, a marine gastropod mollusk or micromollusk in the family Cystiscidae.
