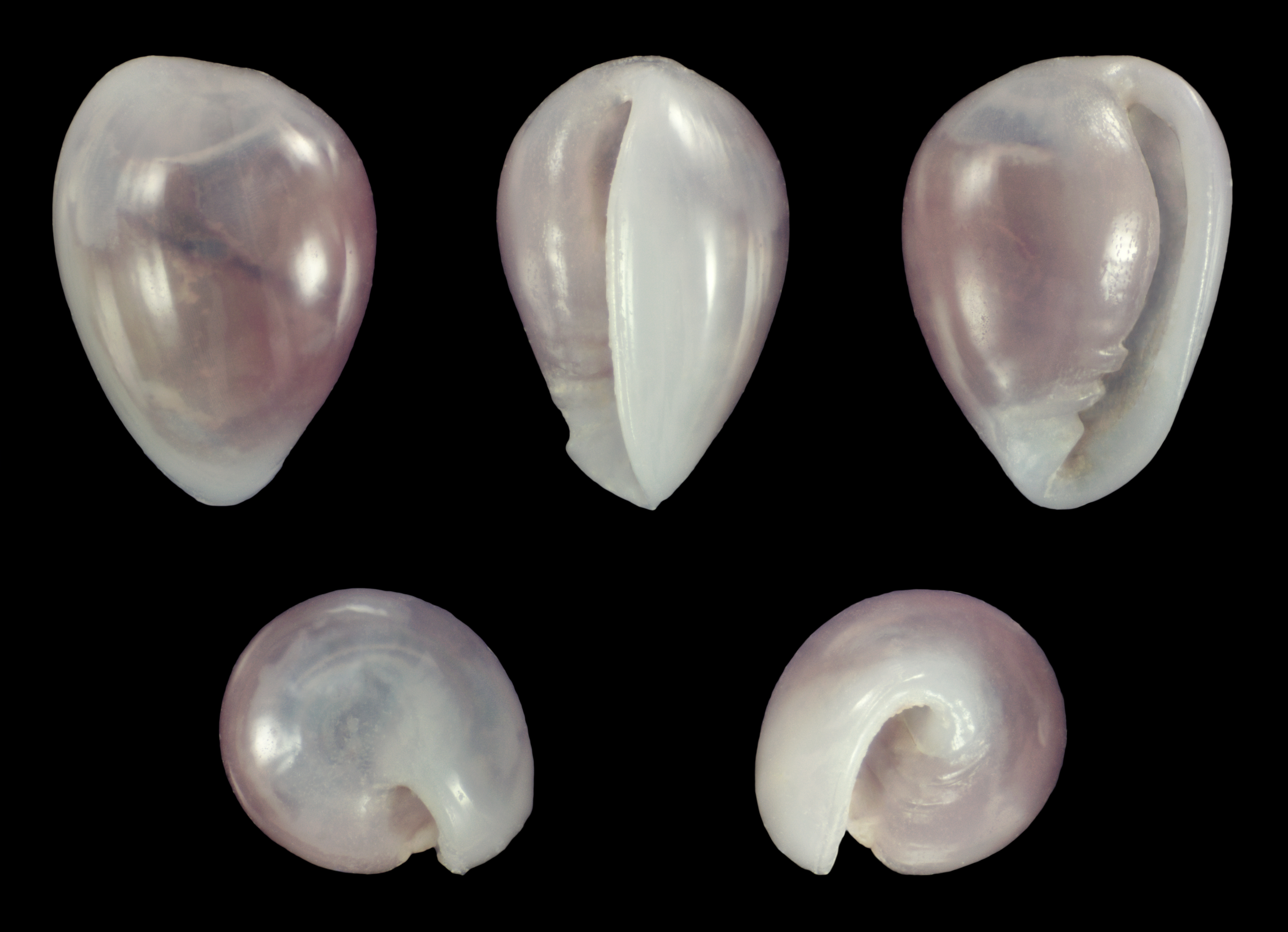

Scientific classification
- Kingdom: Animalia
- Phylum: Mollusca
- Class: Gastropoda
- Subclass: Caenogastropoda
- Order: Neogastropoda
- Family: Cystiscidae
- Subfamily: Cystiscinae
- Genus: Crithe
- Species: C. cossinea

Binomial name
- Crithe cossinea Cossignani, 1997

= Crithe cossinea =

Species of gastropod

Crithe cossinea is a species of very small sea snail, a marine gastropod mollusk or micromollusk in the family Cystiscidae.
