= Inbiocystiscus gamezi =

Scientific classification
- Kingdom: Animalia
- Phylum: Mollusca
- Class: Gastropoda
- Subclass: Caenogastropoda
- Order: Neogastropoda
- Family: Cystiscidae
- Subfamily: Cystiscinae
- Genus: Inbiocystiscus
- Species: I. gamezi

Binomial name
- Inbiocystiscus gamezi Ortea & Espinosa, 2001

Species of gastropod

Inbiocystiscus gomezi is a species of very small sea snail, a marine gastropod mollusk or micromollusk in the family Cystiscidae.
