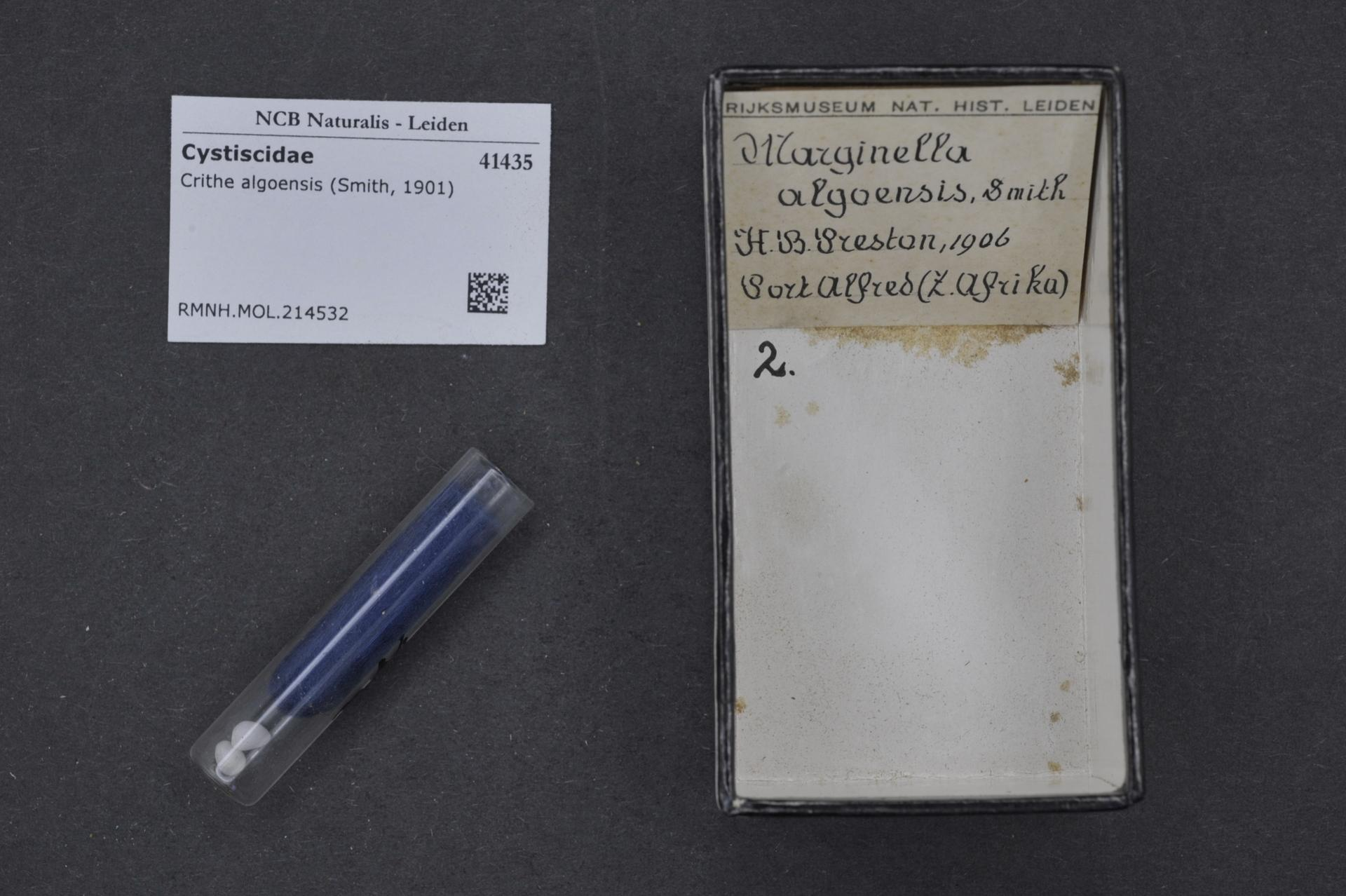
- Crithe algoensis

Scientific classification
- Kingdom: Animalia
- Phylum: Mollusca
- Class: Gastropoda
- Subclass: Caenogastropoda
- Order: Neogastropoda
- Family: Cystiscidae
- Subfamily: Cystiscinae
- Genus: Crithe
- Species: C. algoensis

Binomial name
- Crithe algoensis (Smith, 1901)

Synonyms
- Cystiscus algoensis (E. A. Smith, 1901); Granulina algoensis (E. A. Smith, 1901); Marginella algoensis Smith, 1901

= Crithe algoensis =

Species of gastropod

Crithe algoensis is a species of very small sea snail, a marine gastropod mollusk or micromollusk in the family Cystiscidae.

== Distribution ==
This marine species occurs in Algoa Bay
