= Crithe cassidiformis =

Scientific classification
- Kingdom: Animalia
- Phylum: Mollusca
- Class: Gastropoda
- Subclass: Caenogastropoda
- Order: Neogastropoda
- Family: Cystiscidae
- Subfamily: Cystiscinae
- Genus: Crithe
- Species: C. cassidiformis

Binomial name
- Crithe cassidiformis Boyer, 2018

Synonyms
- Crithe cassidiforme Boyer, 2018 (incorrect gender agreement of specific epithet)

Species of gastropod

Crithe cassidiformis is a species of very small sea snail, a marine gastropod mollusk or micromollusk in the family Cystiscidae.

== Distribution ==
This marine species occurs off the Maldives.
