= Intelcystiscus teresacarrenoae =

Scientific classification
- Kingdom: Animalia
- Phylum: Mollusca
- Class: Gastropoda
- Subclass: Caenogastropoda
- Order: Neogastropoda
- Family: Cystiscidae
- Subfamily: Cystiscinae
- Genus: Intelcystiscus
- Species: I. teresacarrenoae

Binomial name
- Intelcystiscus teresacarrenoae Ortea & Espinosa, 2016

Species of gastropod

Intelcystiscus teresacarrenoae is a species of very small sea snail, a marine gastropod mollusk or micromollusk in the family Cystiscidae.

== Distribution ==
This marine species occurs off Guadeloupe. It is named after Teresa Carreño, who was paid tribute in the first edition of the Musiciennes in Guadeloupe festival, which took place at the same time as the expedition that collected the holotype.
