= Gibberula rufanensis =

Scientific classification
- Kingdom: Animalia
- Phylum: Mollusca
- Class: Gastropoda
- Subclass: Caenogastropoda
- Order: Neogastropoda
- Family: Cystiscidae
- Subfamily: Cystiscinae
- Genus: Gibberula
- Species: G. rufanensis

Binomial name
- Gibberula rufanensis (W. H. Turton, 1932)

Synonyms
- Marginella rufanensis W. H. Turton, 1932

Species of gastropod

Gibberula rufanensis is a species of sea snail, a marine gastropod mollusk, in the family Cystiscidae.
