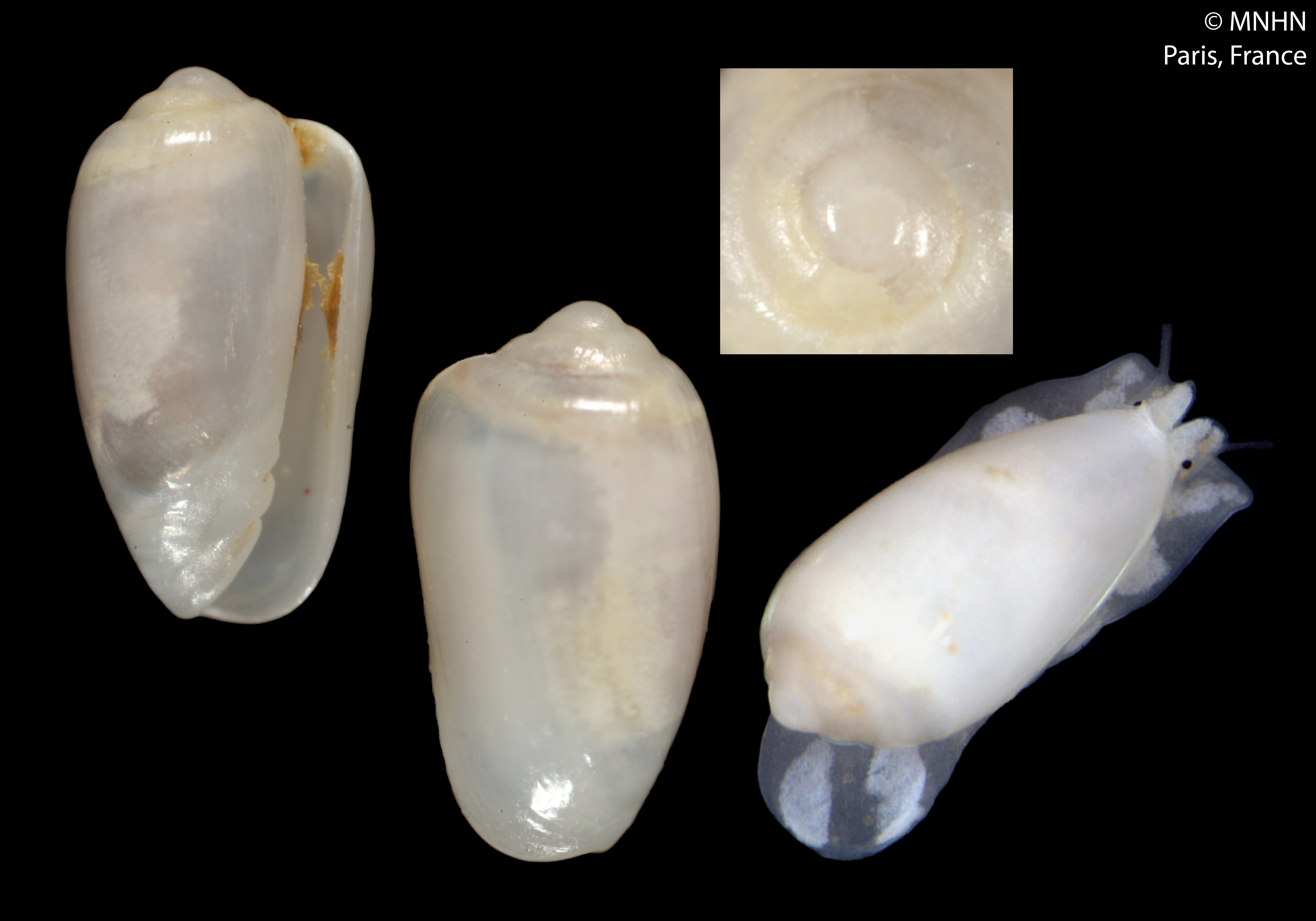
- Shell of Giberula gradatim (holotype at MNHN, Paris)

Scientific classification
- Kingdom: Animalia
- Phylum: Mollusca
- Class: Gastropoda
- Subclass: Caenogastropoda
- Order: Neogastropoda
- Family: Cystiscidae
- Subfamily: Cystiscinae
- Genus: Gibberula
- Species: G. gradatim

Binomial name
- Gibberula gradatim McCleery, 2008

= Gibberula gradatim =

Species of gastropod

Gibberula gradatim is a species of very small sea snail, a marine gastropod mollusc or micromollusc in the family Cystiscidae.

== Description ==
The shell of Gibberula gradatim reaches an average length of 2.33 millimeters. It belongs to a group known as micromollusc due to its exceptionally small size. Like other members of its genus, it possesses a smooth, glossy, mineralized shell structure designed to protect its soft body from predators.

== Habitat and Distribution ==
This marine species belongs to the benthic biome, meaning it lives and feeds directly along the seafloor. It inhabits the tropical marine waters of the Caribbean Sea, primarily concentrated in the coastal waters off Venezuela.
