= Intelcystiscus gordonmoorei =

Scientific classification
- Kingdom: Animalia
- Phylum: Mollusca
- Class: Gastropoda
- Subclass: Caenogastropoda
- Order: Neogastropoda
- Family: Cystiscidae
- Subfamily: Cystiscinae
- Genus: Intelcystiscus
- Species: I. gordonmoorei

Binomial name
- Intelcystiscus gordonmoorei Ortea & Espinosa, 2001

Species of gastropod

Intelcystiscus gordonmoorei is a species of very small sea snail, a marine gastropod mollusk or micromollusk in the family Cystiscidae.
