= Intelcystiscus yemayae =

Scientific classification
- Kingdom: Animalia
- Phylum: Mollusca
- Class: Gastropoda
- Subclass: Caenogastropoda
- Order: Neogastropoda
- Family: Cystiscidae
- Subfamily: Cystiscinae
- Genus: Intelcystiscus
- Species: I. yemayae

Binomial name
- Intelcystiscus yemayae Espinosa & Ortea, 2003

Species of gastropod

Intelcystiscus yemayae is a species of very small sea snail, a marine gastropod mollusk or micromollusk in the family Cystiscidae.
