= Inbiocystiscus triplicatus =

Scientific classification
- Kingdom: Animalia
- Phylum: Mollusca
- Class: Gastropoda
- Subclass: Caenogastropoda
- Order: Neogastropoda
- Family: Cystiscidae
- Subfamily: Cystiscinae
- Genus: Inbiocystiscus
- Species: I. triplicatus

Binomial name
- Inbiocystiscus triplicatus Espinosa & Ortea, 2007

Species of gastropod

Inbiocystiscus triplicata is a species of very small sea snail, a marine gastropod mollusk or micromollusk in the family Cystiscidae.
