= Gibberula raquelae =

Scientific classification
- Kingdom: Animalia
- Phylum: Mollusca
- Class: Gastropoda
- Subclass: Caenogastropoda
- Order: Neogastropoda
- Family: Cystiscidae
- Subfamily: Cystiscinae
- Genus: Gibberula
- Species: G. raquelae

Binomial name
- Gibberula raquelae Ortea & Moro, 2018

Species of gastropod

Gibberula raquelae is a species of sea snail, a marine gastropod mollusk, in the family Cystiscidae.

== Distribution ==
This species occurs in Cape Verde.
