= Gibberula jeanae =

Scientific classification
- Kingdom: Animalia
- Phylum: Mollusca
- Class: Gastropoda
- Subclass: Caenogastropoda
- Order: Neogastropoda
- Family: Cystiscidae
- Subfamily: Cystiscinae
- Genus: Gibberula
- Species: G. jeanae

Binomial name
- Gibberula jeanae Lussi & Smith, 1998

Species of gastropod

Gibberula jeanae is a species of very small sea snail, a marine gastropod mollusk or micromollusk in the family Cystiscidae.

== Description ==
Gibberula jeanae was introduced by Lussi and Smith in 1998 as one of eight new species and three new genera in the family Cystiscidae.

== Distribution ==
Gibberula jeanae is found in South Africa.
