= Gibberula almo =

Scientific classification
- Kingdom: Animalia
- Phylum: Mollusca
- Class: Gastropoda
- Subclass: Caenogastropoda
- Order: Neogastropoda
- Family: Cystiscidae
- Subfamily: Cystiscinae
- Genus: Gibberula
- Species: G. almo

Binomial name
- Gibberula almo (Bartsch, 1915)

Synonyms
- Marginella almo Bartsch, 1915

Species of gastropod

Gibberula almo is a species of sea snail, a marine gastropod mollusk, in the family Cystiscidae.
