= Gibberula achenea =

Scientific classification
- Kingdom: Animalia
- Phylum: Mollusca
- Class: Gastropoda
- Subclass: Caenogastropoda
- Order: Neogastropoda
- Family: Cystiscidae
- Subfamily: Cystiscinae
- Genus: Gibberula
- Species: G. achenea

Binomial name
- Gibberula achenea (Roth & Coan, 1971)

Synonyms
- Granula achenea Roth & Coan, 1971

Species of gastropod

Gibberula achenea is a species of sea snail, a marine gastropod mollusk, in the family Cystiscidae.
