= Intelcystiscus coyi =

Scientific classification
- Kingdom: Animalia
- Phylum: Mollusca
- Class: Gastropoda
- Subclass: Caenogastropoda
- Order: Neogastropoda
- Family: Cystiscidae
- Subfamily: Cystiscinae
- Genus: Intelcystiscus
- Species: I. coyi

Binomial name
- Intelcystiscus coyi Espinosa & Ortea, 2002

Species of gastropod

Intelcystiscus coyi is a species of very small sea snail, a marine gastropod mollusk or micromollusk in the family Cystiscidae.
