= Crithe nipponica =

Scientific classification
- Kingdom: Animalia
- Phylum: Mollusca
- Class: Gastropoda
- Subclass: Caenogastropoda
- Order: Neogastropoda
- Family: Cystiscidae
- Subfamily: Cystiscinae
- Genus: Crithe
- Species: C. nipponica

Binomial name
- Crithe nipponica (Habe, 1951)

Synonyms
- Microvulina nipponica Habe, 1951

Species of gastropod

Crithe nipponica is a species of very small sea snail, a marine gastropod mollusk or micromollusk in the family Cystiscidae. They can grow to 1.5 mm in length, and are located in the benthic zone. Geographically, they can be found in the Philippine Sea.
