= Crithe nanaoensis =

Scientific classification
- Kingdom: Animalia
- Phylum: Mollusca
- Class: Gastropoda
- Subclass: Caenogastropoda
- Order: Neogastropoda
- Family: Cystiscidae
- Subfamily: Cystiscinae
- Genus: Crithe
- Species: C. nanaoensis

Binomial name
- Crithe nanaoensis (Habe, 1951)

Synonyms
- Microvulina nanaoensis Habe, 1951

Species of gastropod

Crithe nanaoensis is a species of very small sea snail, a marine gastropod mollusk or micromollusk in the family Cystiscidae.
