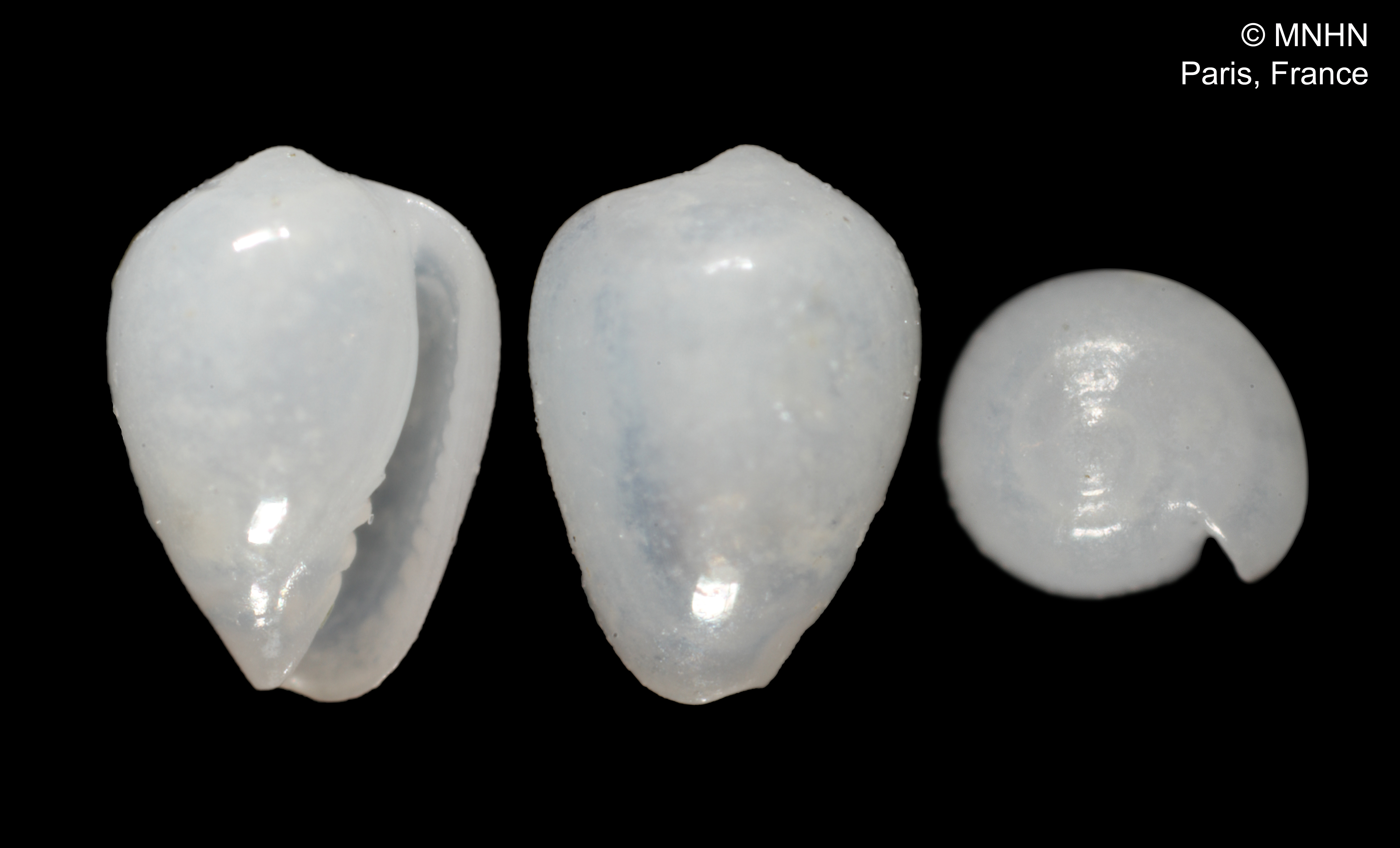
- Shell of Gibberula vomoensis (holotype at MNHN, Paris)

Scientific classification
- Kingdom: Animalia
- Phylum: Mollusca
- Class: Gastropoda
- Subclass: Caenogastropoda
- Order: Neogastropoda
- Family: Cystiscidae
- Subfamily: Cystiscinae
- Genus: Gibberula
- Species: G. vomoensis

Binomial name
- Gibberula vomoensis Wakefield & McCleery, 2004

= Gibberula vomoensis =

Species of gastropod

Gibberula vomoensis is a species of very small sea snail, a marine gastropod mollusk or micromollusk in the family Cystiscidae.

== Distribution ==
This marine species occurs off the Fidji Islands.
