= Gibberula hernandezi =

Scientific classification
- Kingdom: Animalia
- Phylum: Mollusca
- Class: Gastropoda
- Subclass: Caenogastropoda
- Order: Neogastropoda
- Family: Cystiscidae
- Subfamily: Cystiscinae
- Genus: Gibberula
- Species: G. hernandezi

Binomial name
- Gibberula hernandezi Contreras & Talavera, 1988

Species of sea snail

Gibberula hernandezi is a species of very small sea snail, a marine gastropod mollusk or micromollusk in the family Cystiscidae.
