= Intelcystiscus rancholunensis =

Scientific classification
- Kingdom: Animalia
- Phylum: Mollusca
- Class: Gastropoda
- Subclass: Caenogastropoda
- Order: Neogastropoda
- Family: Cystiscidae
- Subfamily: Cystiscinae
- Genus: Intelcystiscus
- Species: I. rancholunensis

Binomial name
- Intelcystiscus rancholunensis Espinosa & Ortea, 2006

Species of gastropod

Intelcystiscus rancholunensis is a species of very small sea snail, a marine gastropod mollusk or micromollusk in the family Cystiscidae.

== Description ==
Intelcystiscus rancholunensis has a small, smooth and polished shell that is broadly subcylindrical in shape. The anterior end is rounded and pointed, while the posterior end is broad and smoothly rounded to almost flattened. The spire is low and consists of two whorls; the final whorl accounts for approximately 90% of the shell's total length. The columella has three well-developed folds, particularly the two anterior folds, together with a fourth, very weak internal fold. The outer lip is relatively straight and sharp, without internal denticles or lirae. The aperture is almost as long as the shell, narrower posteriorly and broader anteriorly. The shell is described as translucent white. The holotype measures 2.3 mm in length and 1.3 mm in width.
