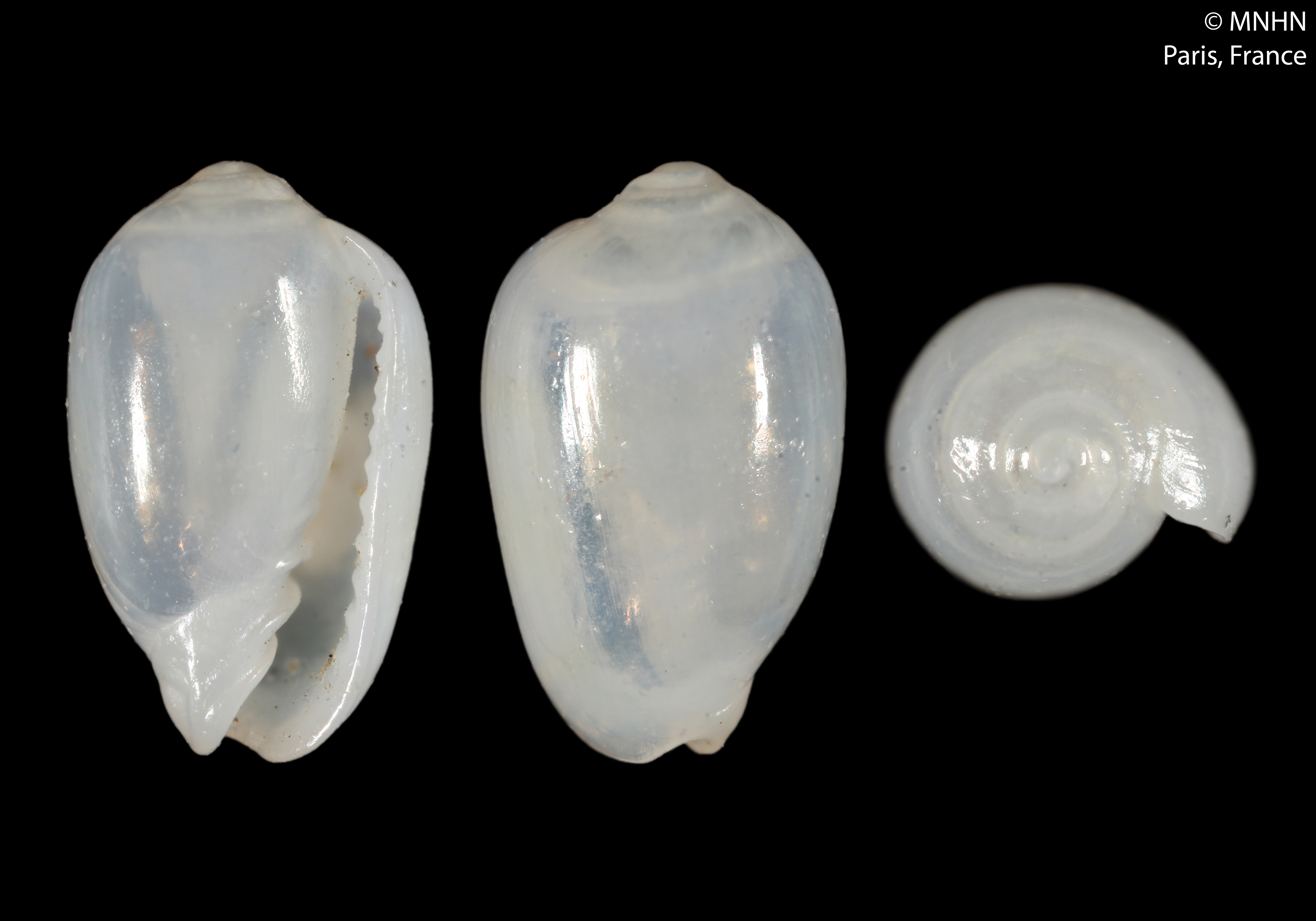
- Shell of Gibberula borbonica (holotype at MNHN, Paris)

Scientific classification
- Kingdom: Animalia
- Phylum: Mollusca
- Class: Gastropoda
- Subclass: Caenogastropoda
- Order: Neogastropoda
- Family: Cystiscidae
- Subfamily: Cystiscinae
- Genus: Gibberula
- Species: G. borbonica

Binomial name
- Gibberula borbonica Boyer, 2014

= Gibberula borbonica =

Species of gastropod

Gibberula borbonica is a species of sea snail, a marine gastropod mollusk, in the family Cystiscidae.

== Description ==
The length of the shell attains 2.3 mm.

== Distribution ==
This species occurs off Réunion.
