= Crithe marianoi =

Scientific classification
- Kingdom: Animalia
- Phylum: Mollusca
- Class: Gastropoda
- Subclass: Caenogastropoda
- Order: Neogastropoda
- Family: Cystiscidae
- Subfamily: Cystiscinae
- Genus: Crithe
- Species: C. marianoi

Binomial name
- Crithe marianoi Cossignani, 2001

Species of gastropod

Crithe marianoi is a species of very small sea snail, a marine gastropod mollusk or micromollusk in the family Cystiscidae.
