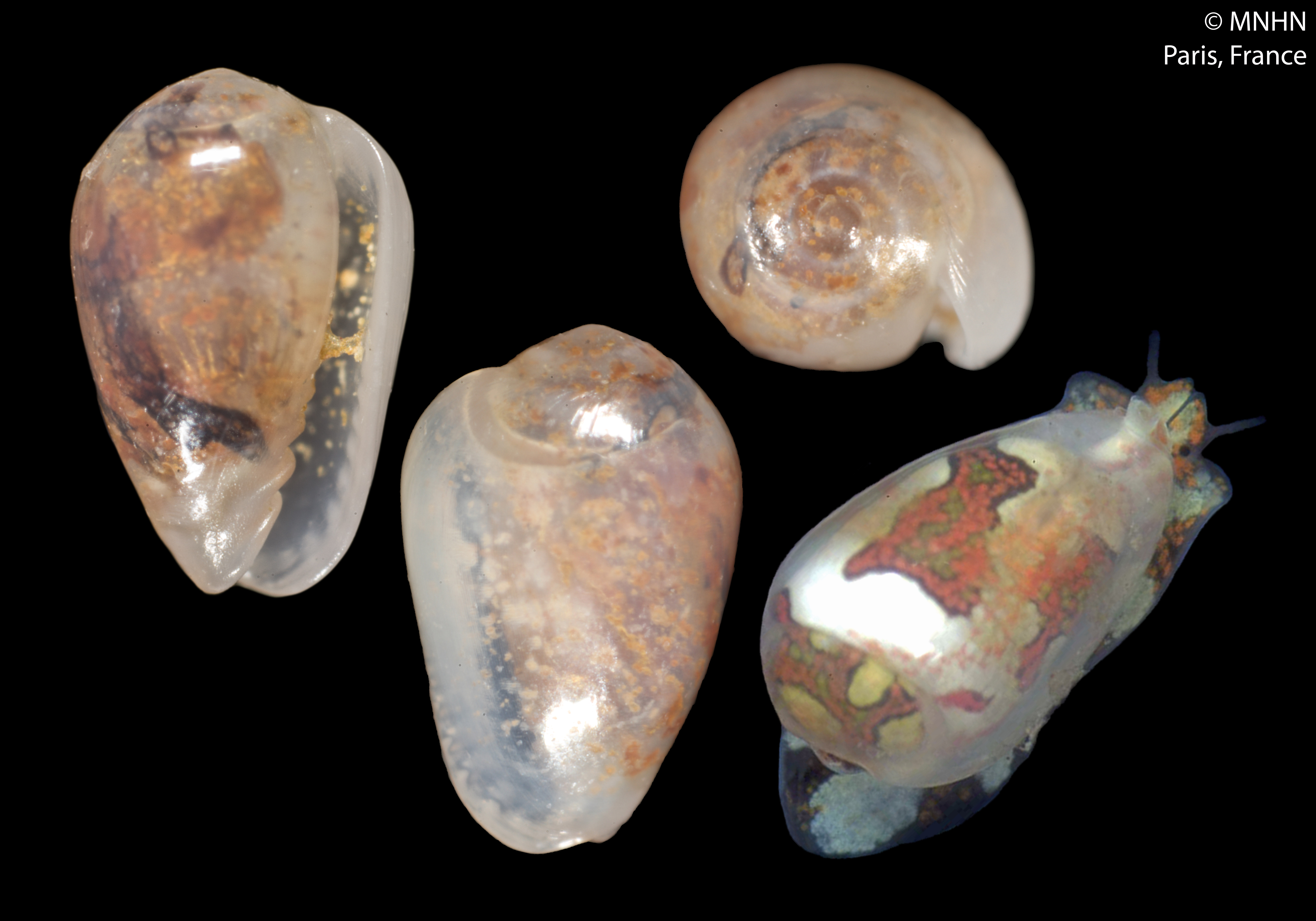
- Shell of Gibberula conejoensis (holotype at MNHN, Paris)

Scientific classification
- Kingdom: Animalia
- Phylum: Mollusca
- Class: Gastropoda
- Subclass: Caenogastropoda
- Order: Neogastropoda
- Family: Cystiscidae
- Subfamily: Cystiscinae
- Genus: Gibberula
- Species: G. conejoensis

Binomial name
- Gibberula conejoensis McCleery, 2008

= Gibberula conejoensis =

Species of gastropod

Gibberula conejoensis is a species of very small sea snail, a marine gastropod mollusc or micromollusc in the family Cystiscidae.

== Description ==
The length of this species attains 2.55 mm.

== Distribution ==
It has only been found in its type locality, Isla Conejo, Los Testigos Islands, which are Federal Dependencies of Venezuela in the Caribbean.
