= Gibberula mandyi =

Scientific classification
- Kingdom: Animalia
- Phylum: Mollusca
- Class: Gastropoda
- Subclass: Caenogastropoda
- Order: Neogastropoda
- Family: Cystiscidae
- Subfamily: Cystiscinae
- Genus: Gibberula
- Species: G. mandyi

Binomial name
- Gibberula mandyi Espinosa & Ortea, 2006

Species of gastropod

Gibberula mandyi is a species of very small sea snail, a marine gastropod mollusk or micromollusk in the family Cystiscidae.
