= Gibberula agapeta =

Scientific classification
- Kingdom: Animalia
- Phylum: Mollusca
- Class: Gastropoda
- Subclass: Caenogastropoda
- Order: Neogastropoda
- Family: Cystiscidae
- Subfamily: Cystiscinae
- Genus: Gibberula
- Species: G. agapeta

Binomial name
- Gibberula agapeta (R. B. Watson, 1886)

Synonyms
- Kogomea royana Laseron, 1957; Marginella agapeta R. B. Watson, 1886; Marginella punicea Laseron, 1948; Marginella quinqueplicata Laseron, 1948; Mesoginella punicea (Laseron, 1948)

Species of gastropod

Gibberula agapeta is a species of sea snail, a marine gastropod mollusk, in the family Cystiscidae.
