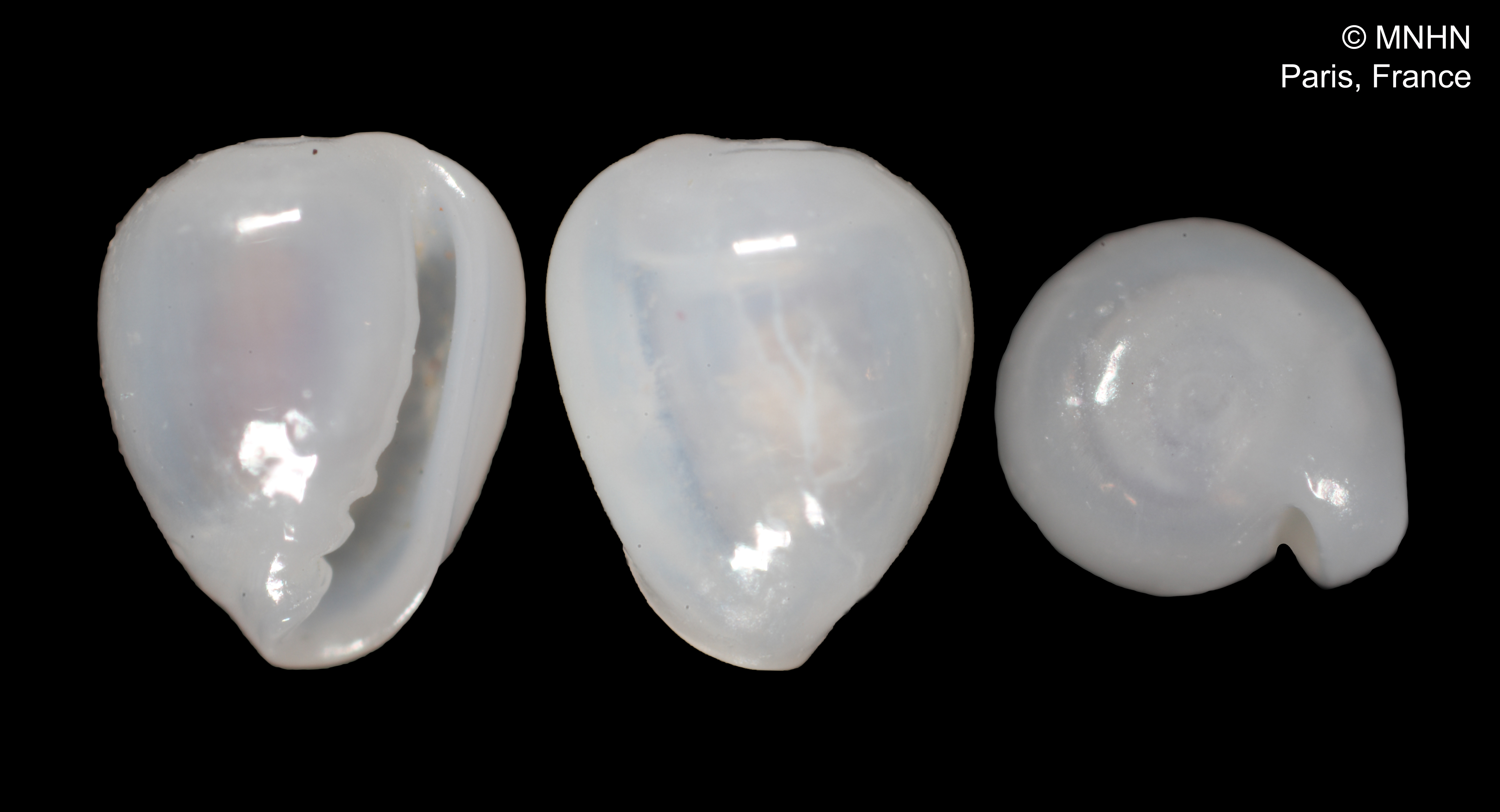
- Crithe caledonica

Scientific classification
- Kingdom: Animalia
- Phylum: Mollusca
- Class: Gastropoda
- Subclass: Caenogastropoda
- Order: Neogastropoda
- Family: Cystiscidae
- Subfamily: Cystiscinae
- Genus: Crithe
- Species: C. caledonica

Binomial name
- Crithe caledonica Boyer, 2003

= Crithe caledonica =

Species of gastropod

Crithe caledonica is a species of very small sea snail, a marine gastropod mollusk or micromollusk in the family Cystiscidae.
