= Intelcystiscus =

Scientific classification
- Domain: Eukaryota
- Kingdom: Animalia
- Phylum: Mollusca
- Class: Gastropoda
- Subclass: Caenogastropoda
- Order: Neogastropoda
- Family: Cystiscidae
- Subfamily: Cystiscinae
- Genus: Intelcystiscus; Ortea & Espinosa, 2001

Type species
- Intelcystiscus gordonmoorei Ortea & Espinosa, 2001

Genus of gastropods

Intelcystiscus is a genus of minute sea snail, a marine gastropod mollusc or micromollusc in the family Cystiscidae.

== Species ==
Species within the genus Intelcystiscus include:

- Intelcystiscus coyi Espinosa & Ortea, 2002
- Intelcystiscus gordonmoorei Ortea & Espinosa, 2001
- Intelcystiscus rancholunensis Espinosa & Ortea, 2006
- Intelcystiscus teresacarrenoae Ortea & Espinosa, 2016
- Intelcystiscus yemayae Espinosa & Ortea, 2003
