= Inbiocystiscus =

Scientific classification
- Domain: Eukaryota
- Kingdom: Animalia
- Phylum: Mollusca
- Class: Gastropoda
- Subclass: Caenogastropoda
- Order: Neogastropoda
- Family: Cystiscidae
- Subfamily: Cystiscinae
- Genus: Inbiocystiscus; Ortea & Espinosa, 2001

Type species
- Inbiocystiscus gomezi Ortea & Espinosa, 2001

Genus of gastropods

Inbiocystiscus is a genus of minute sea snail, a marine gastropod mollusc in the family Cystiscidae.

== Species ==
Species within the genus Inbiocystiscus include:

- Inbiocystiscus faroi Ortea & Espinosa, 2006
- Inbiocystiscus gamezi Ortea & Espinosa, 2001
- Inbiocystiscus tanialeonae Ortea & Espinosa, 2016
- Inbiocystiscus triplicatus Espinosa & Ortea, 2007
