= Ticocystiscus =

Scientific classification
- Domain: Eukaryota
- Kingdom: Animalia
- Phylum: Mollusca
- Class: Gastropoda
- Subclass: Caenogastropoda
- Order: Neogastropoda
- Family: Cystiscidae
- Subfamily: Cystiscinae
- Genus: Ticocystiscus; Espinosa & Ortea, 2002

Genus of gastropods

Ticocystiscus is a genus of minute sea snail, a marine gastropod mollusc in the family Cystiscidae.

This genus, and indeed all the genera in the family, were previously and sometimes still are, placed in the family Marginellidae.

== Species ==
- Ticocystiscus iberia Espinosa & Ortea, 2002 - type species
