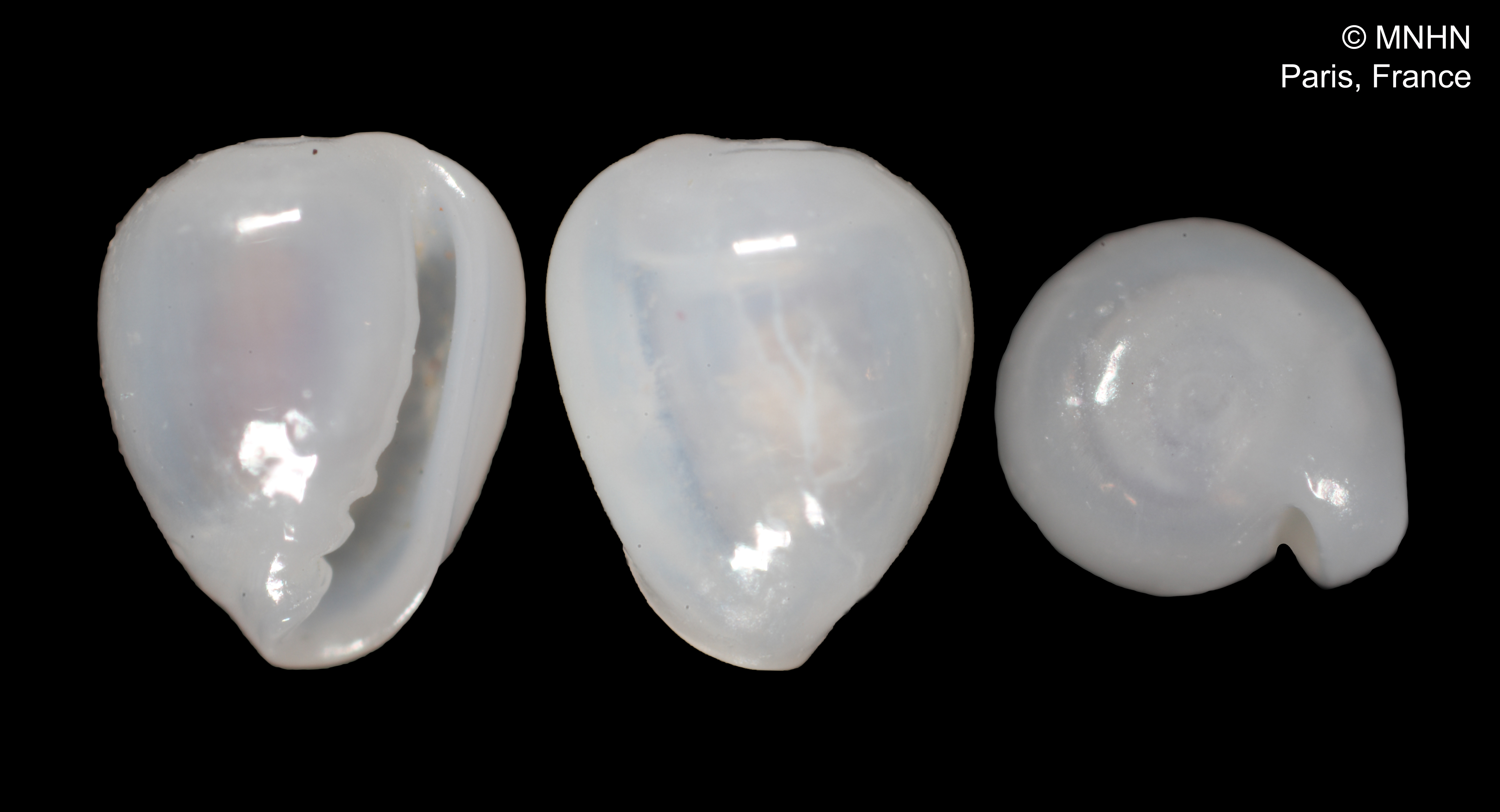
- Crithe caledonica

Scientific classification
- Kingdom: Animalia
- Phylum: Mollusca
- Class: Gastropoda
- Subclass: Caenogastropoda
- Order: Neogastropoda
- Family: Cystiscidae
- Subfamily: Cystiscinae
- Genus: Crithe; Gould, 1860

Type species
- Crithe atomaria Gould, 1860

= Crithe =

Genus of gastropods

Crithe is a genus of minute sea snails, marine gastropod mollusks or micromollusks in the family Cystiscidae. This genus is sometimes still placed within the Marginellidae.

These tiny gastropods have a shell which is colorless and is transparent when fresh.

== Distribution ==
This genus is found in the Indo-Pacific.

== Shell description ==
Shell minute to small, white, hyaline; spire usually immersed, rarely low; lip thickened, smooth, lacking denticulation; external varix absent; siphonal notch absent; posterior notch absent; columella multiplicate, with 6-8 plications plus parietal lirae, plications usually excavated inside aperture due to collabral parietal callus ridge.

== Species ==
Species within the genus Crithe include:

- Crithe algoensis (Smith, 1901)
- Crithe atomaria Gould, 1860
- Crithe caledonica Boyer, 2003
- Crithe cassidiformis Boyer, 2018
- Crithe cossinea Cossignani, 1997
- Crithe gofasi Boyer, 2003
- Crithe huna (Kay, 1979)
- Crithe marianoi Cossignani, 2001
- Crithe nanaoensis (Habe, 1951)
- Crithe nipponica (Habe, 1951)
- Crithe togatulus Boyer, 2018
