= Marginocystiscus =

Scientific classification
- Kingdom: Animalia
- Phylum: Mollusca
- Class: Gastropoda
- Subclass: Caenogastropoda
- Order: Neogastropoda
- Family: Cystiscidae
- Subfamily: Cystiscinae
- Genus: †Marginocystiscus; Landau, da Silva & Heitz, 2016

Extinct genus of gastropods

Marginocystiscus is an extinct genus of sea snails, marine gastropod mollusks, in the family Cystiscidae.

== Species ==
Species within the genus Marginocystiscus include:

- †Marginocystiscus subtilplicatus Landau, da Silva & Heitz, 2016
