= Topaginella =

Topaginella Temporal range: Miocene

Scientific classification
- Kingdom: Animalia
- Phylum: Mollusca
- Class: Gastropoda
- Subclass: Caenogastropoda
- Order: Neogastropoda
- Family: Cystiscidae
- Subfamily: Cystiscinae
- Genus: †Topaginella; Laseron, 1957

Genus of gastropods

Topaginella is a genus of minute fossil sea snails, marine gastropod mollusks or micromollusks in the family Cystiscidae. Like all of the related genera, this genus is sometimes still classified in the family Marginellidae.

This genus is extinct.

== Shell description ==
Shell minute, pyriform, strongly narrowed anteriorly; spire low; lip thickened, strongly denticulate; external varix probably absent (needs to be confirmed); distinct axial costae present; siphonal notch absent; columella multiplicate, with combined total of usually 8 plications plus parietal lirae.

== Type species ==
The type species of the genus Topaginella is Marginella octoplicata Tenison Woods, 1877 †; OD (M)

Remarks: The type species seems to be unique (a monotypic genus). The multiplicate columella and lack of a siphonal notch place it near Cystiscus, but the pyriform shape, exserted spire, denticulate lip, and fine axial costae render it distinct.

== Fossil record ==
This genus is known from the Miocene of Australia.
