= Ticocystiscus iberia =

Scientific classification
- Kingdom: Animalia
- Phylum: Mollusca
- Class: Gastropoda
- Subclass: Caenogastropoda
- Order: Neogastropoda
- Family: Cystiscidae
- Genus: Ticocystiscus
- Species: T. iberia

Binomial name
- Ticocystiscus iberia Espinosa & Ortea, 2002

Species of gastropod

Ticocystiscus iberia is a species of very small sea snail, a marine gastropod mollusk or micromollusk in the family Cystiscidae.
