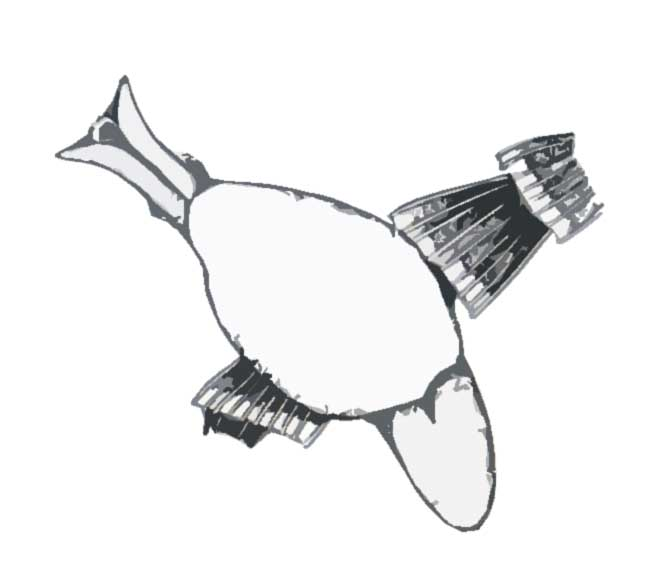
- Drawing of a typical animal in this subfamily

Scientific classification
- Domain: Eukaryota
- Kingdom: Animalia
- Phylum: Mollusca
- Class: Gastropoda
- Subclass: Caenogastropoda
- Order: Neogastropoda
- Family: Cystiscidae
- Subfamily: Cystiscinae; Stimpson, 1865

= Cystiscinae =

Subfamily of gastropods

Cystiscinae are a taxonomic subfamily of minute sea snails. These are marine gastropod mollusks or micromollusks in the family Cystiscidae, and the clade Neogastropoda.

== Diagnosis ==
Shell minute to small, white; spire immersed to low; surface smooth or axially costate; lip thickened, smooth or denticulate; external varix absent; siphonal notch absent; posterior notch absent; columella multiplicate, with combined total of usually 2 to 8 plications plus parietal lirae; internal whorls cystiscid type. Animal mantle smooth, at least partially extending over external shell surface. Internal anatomy unknown.

== Genera ==
Genera within the subfamily Cystiscinae are as follows:

- Crithe Gould, 1860
- Cystiscus Stimpson, 1865:55
- Extra Jousseaume, 1894 - with the only species Extra extra Jousseaume, 1894
- Gibberula Swainson, 1840
- Inbiocystiscus Ortea and Espinosa, 2001
- Intelcystiscus Ortea and Espinosa, 2001
- †Marginocystiscus Landau, C. M. Silva & Heitz, 2016
- Pachybathron Gaskoin, 1853
- Persicula Schumacher, 1817
- Ticocystiscus Espinosa and Ortea, 2002
- Ticofurcilla Espinosa & Ortea, 2002
- †Topaginella Laseron, 1957:288

== Comparative shell structure of three genera ==
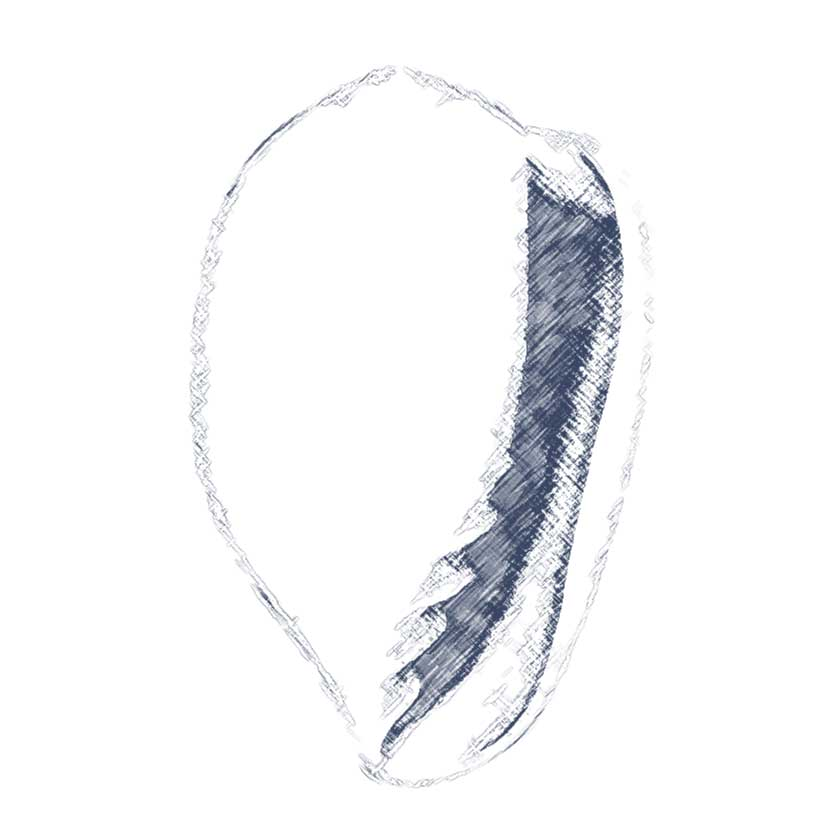
Cystiscus

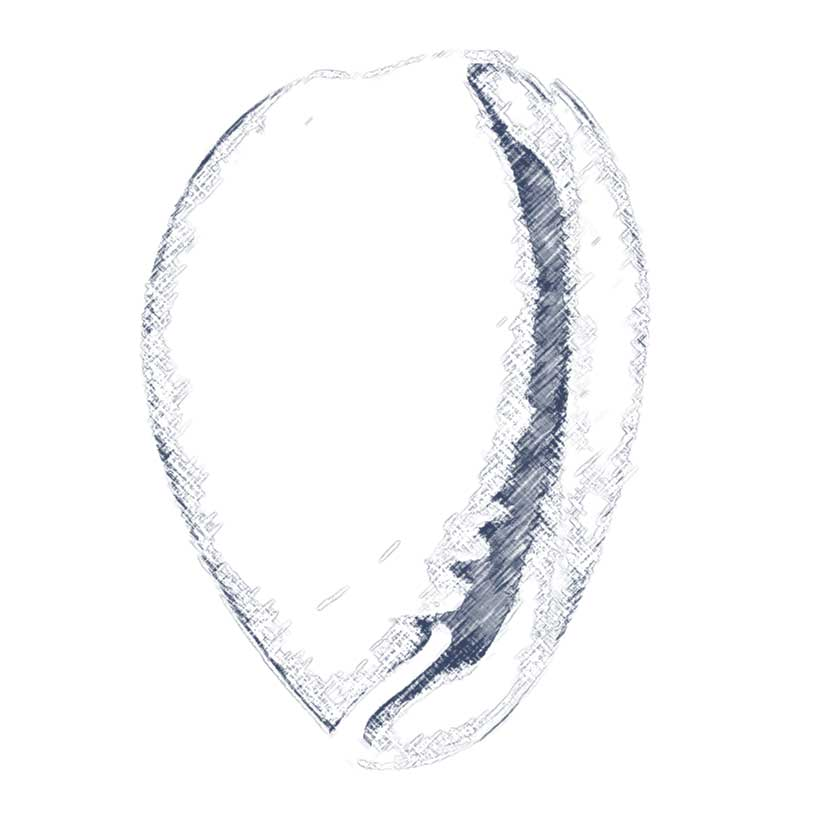
Crithe

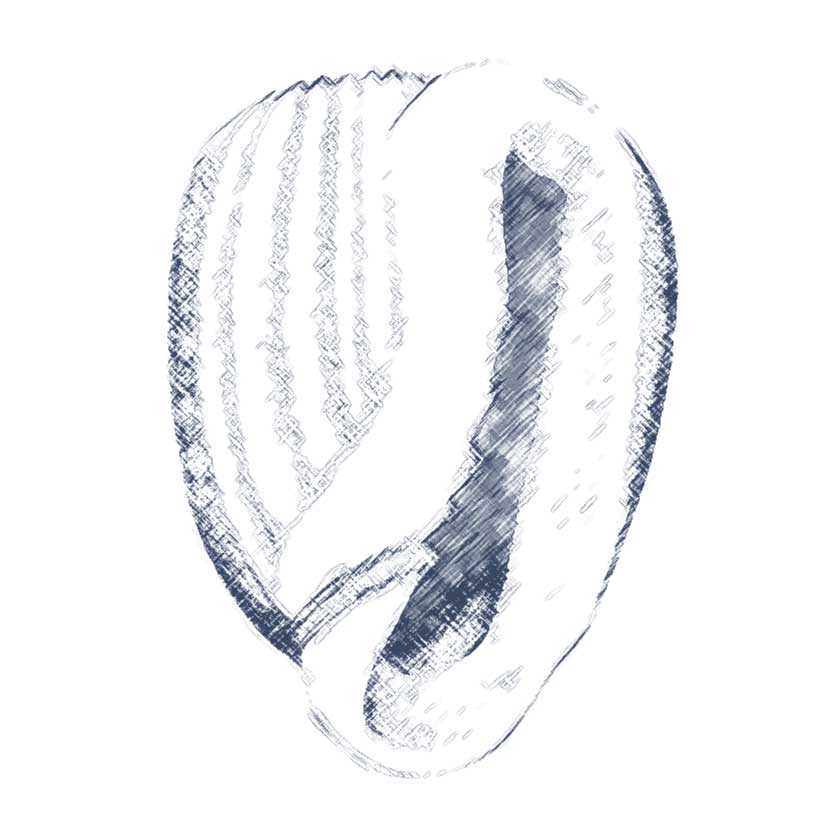
Extra
