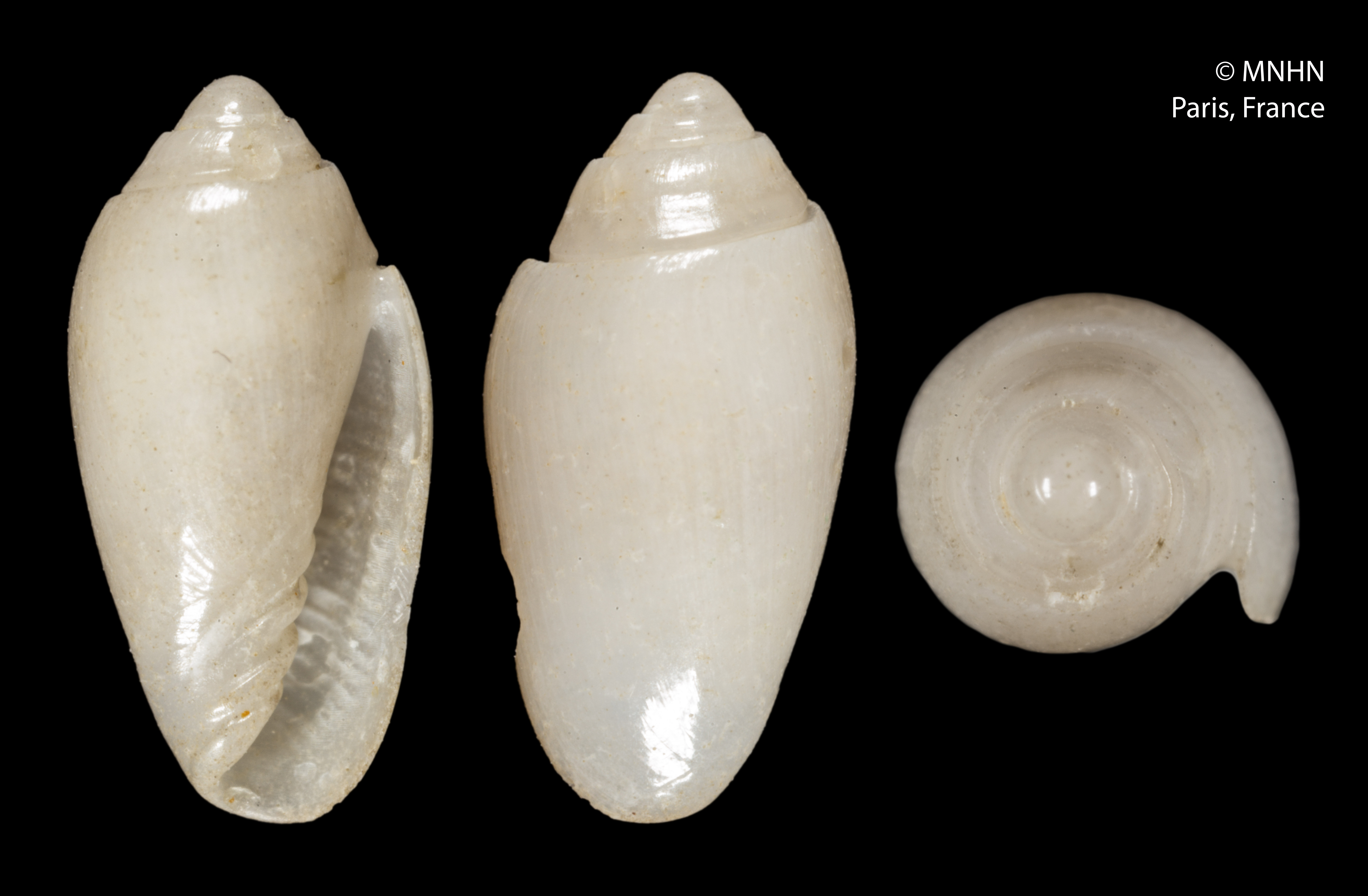
- Shell of Canalispira umuhlwa

Scientific classification
- Kingdom: Animalia
- Phylum: Mollusca
- Class: Gastropoda
- Subclass: Caenogastropoda
- Order: Neogastropoda
- Family: Cystiscidae
- Subfamily: Canalispirinae
- Genus: Canalispira; Jousseaume, 1875

Type species
- Canalispira olivellaeformis Jousseaume, 1875

Synonyms
- Baroginella Laseron, 1957; Osvaldoginella Espinosa & Ortea, 1997

= Canalispira =

Genus of gastropods

Canalispira is a genus of very small sea snails, marine gastropod mollusks or micromollusks in the family Cystiscidae.

== Species ==
Species within the genus Canalispira include:

- Canalispira attentia (Laseron, 1957)
- Canalispira aurea Garcia, 2006
- Canalispira columellaria Boyer, 2018
- Canalispira fallax (Smith, 1903)
- Canalispira infirma (Laseron, 1957)
- Canalispira kerni Garcia, 2007
- Canalispira lipei Garcia, 2007
- Canalispira minor (Dall, 1927)
- Canalispira olivellaeformis Jousseaume, 1875
- Canalispira replicata (Melvill, 1912)
- Canalispira shacklefordi (Preston, 1915)
- Canalispira umuhlwa Kilburn, 1990

Species brought into synonymy

- Canalispira fluctuata McCleery & Wakefield, 2007: synonym of Osvaldoginella fluctuata (McCleery & Wakefield, 2007) (original combination)
- Canalispira gomezi (Espinosa & Ortea, 1997): synonym of Osvaldoginella gomezi Espinosa & Ortea, 1997
- Canalispira hoffi (Moolenbeek & Faber, 1991): synonym of Osvaldoginella hoffi (Moolenbeek & Faber, 1991)
- Canalispira ornata McCleery & Wakefield, 2007: synonym of Osvaldoginella gomezi Espinosa & Ortea, 1997 (original combination)
- Canalispira phantasia McCleery & Wakefield, 2007: synonym of Osvaldoginella phantasia (McCleery & Wakefield, 2007) (original combination)
