= Canalispira minor =

Scientific classification
- Kingdom: Animalia
- Phylum: Mollusca
- Class: Gastropoda
- Subclass: Caenogastropoda
- Order: Neogastropoda
- Family: Cystiscidae
- Subfamily: Canalispirinae
- Genus: Canalispira
- Species: C. minor

Binomial name
- Canalispira minor (Dall, 1927)

Synonyms
- Hyalina styria var. minor Dall, 1927

Species of mollusc

Canalispira minor is a species of sea snail, a marine gastropod mollusk, in the family Cystiscidae.
