= Canalispira attentia =

Scientific classification
- Kingdom: Animalia
- Phylum: Mollusca
- Class: Gastropoda
- Subclass: Caenogastropoda
- Order: Neogastropoda
- Family: Cystiscidae
- Subfamily: Canalispirinae
- Genus: Canalispira
- Species: C. attentia

Binomial name
- Canalispira attentia (Laseron, 1957)

Synonyms
- Baroginella attentia Laseron, 1957

Species of gastropod

Canalispira attentia is a species of sea snail, a marine gastropod mollusk, in the family Cystiscidae.
