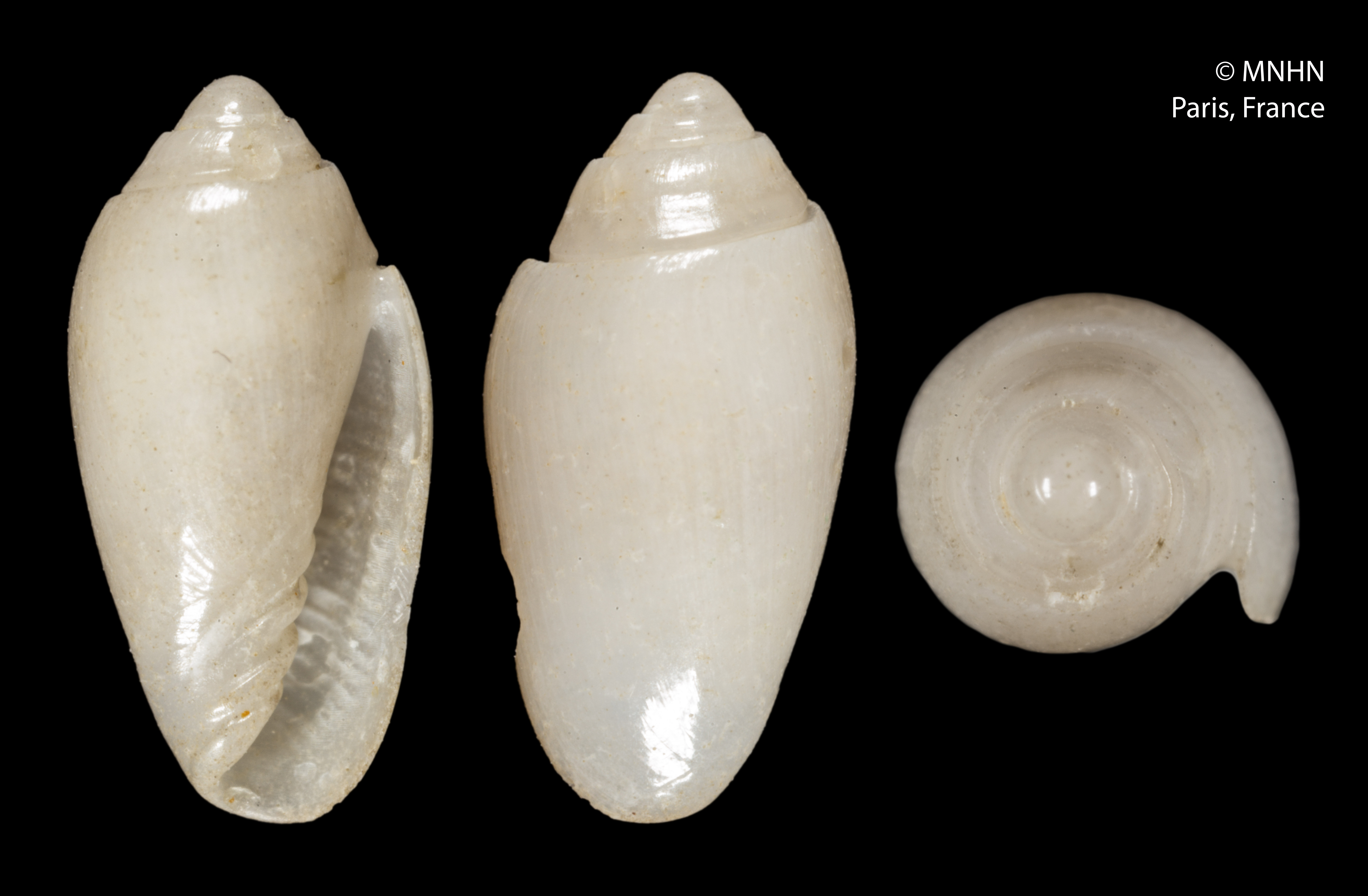
- Shell of Canalispira umuhlwa (paratype at MNHN, Paris)

Scientific classification
- Kingdom: Animalia
- Phylum: Mollusca
- Class: Gastropoda
- Subclass: Caenogastropoda
- Order: Neogastropoda
- Family: Cystiscidae
- Subfamily: Canalispirinae
- Genus: Canalispira
- Species: C. umuhlwa

Binomial name
- Canalispira umuhlwa Kilburn, 1990

= Canalispira umuhlwa =

Species of gastropod

Canalispira umuhlwa is a species of sea snail, a marine gastropod mollusk, in the family Cystiscidae.

== Distribution ==
This marine species occurs off KwaZulu, South Africa.
