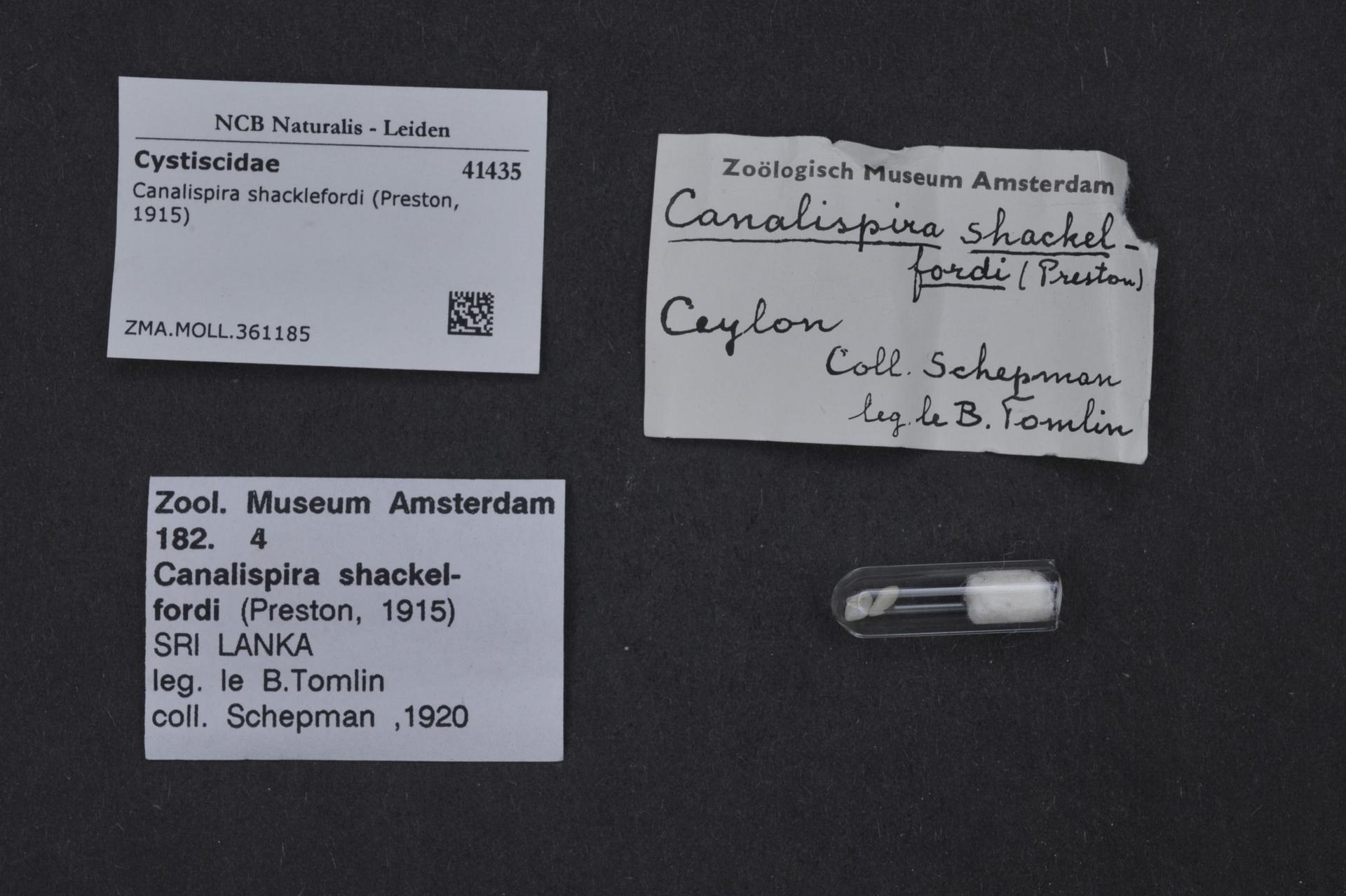
- Canalispira shacklefordi

Scientific classification
- Kingdom: Animalia
- Phylum: Mollusca
- Class: Gastropoda
- Subclass: Caenogastropoda
- Order: Neogastropoda
- Family: Cystiscidae
- Subfamily: Canalispirinae
- Genus: Canalispira
- Species: C. shacklefordi

Binomial name
- Canalispira shacklefordi (Preston, 1915)

Synonyms
- Marginella eburnea Preston, 1906; Marginella shacklefordi Preston, 1915

= Canalispira shacklefordi =

Species of gastropod

Canalispira shacklefordi is a species of sea snail, a marine gastropod mollusk, in the family Cystiscidae.
