= Canalispira aurea =

Scientific classification
- Kingdom: Animalia
- Phylum: Mollusca
- Class: Gastropoda
- Subclass: Caenogastropoda
- Order: Neogastropoda
- Family: Cystiscidae
- Genus: Canalispira
- Species: C. aurea

Binomial name
- Canalispira aurea Garcia, 2006

Species of gastropod

Canalispira aurea is a species of very small sea snail, a marine gastropod mollusk or micromollusk in the family Cystiscidae.
