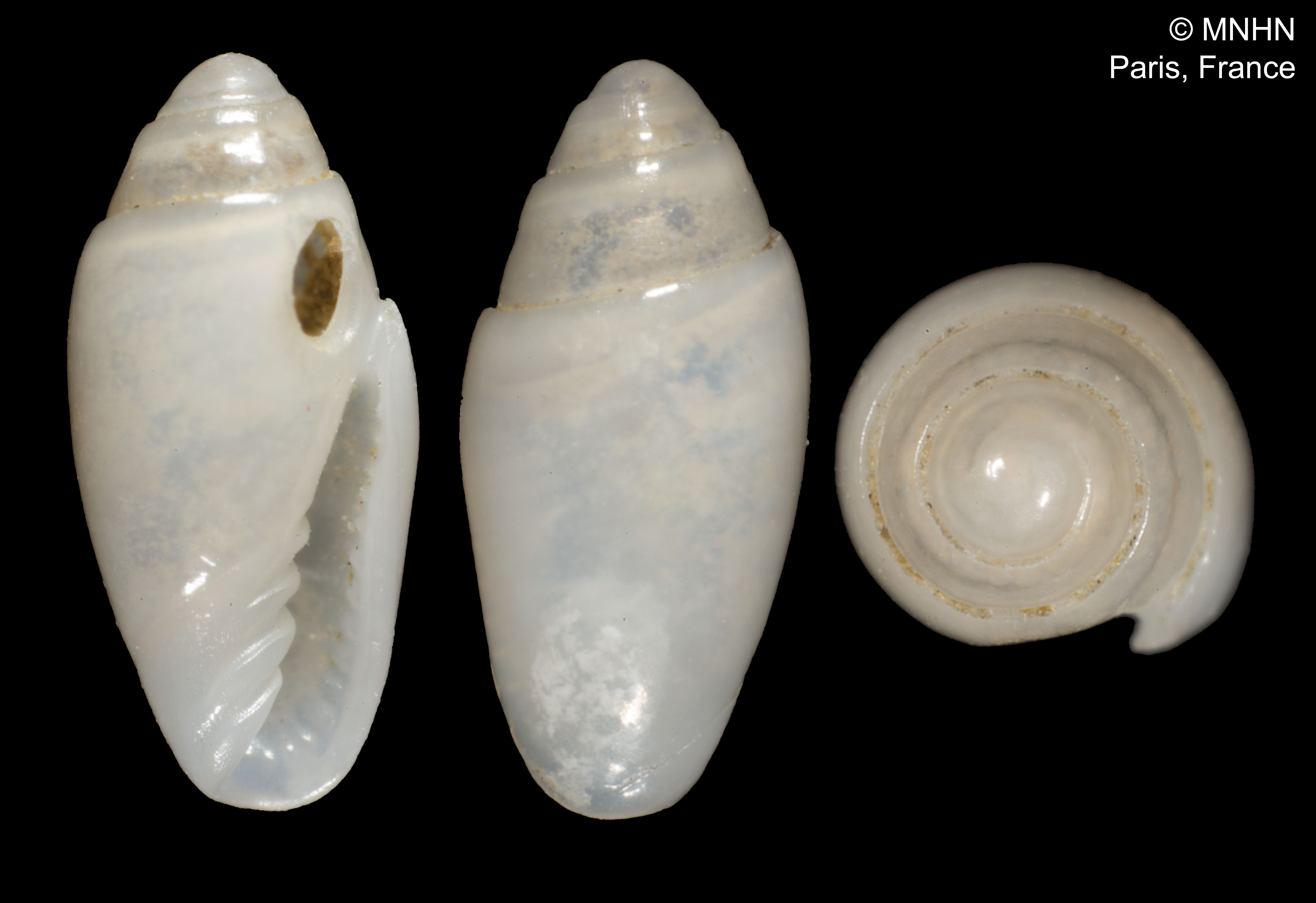
- Shell of Canalispira olivellaeformis (lectotype at MNHN, Paris)

Scientific classification
- Kingdom: Animalia
- Phylum: Mollusca
- Class: Gastropoda
- Subclass: Caenogastropoda
- Order: Neogastropoda
- Family: Cystiscidae
- Subfamily: Canalispirinae
- Genus: Canalispira
- Species: C. olivellaeformis

Binomial name
- Canalispira olivellaeformis Jousseaume, 1875

Synonyms
- Marginella olivellaeformis (Jousseaume, 1875)

= Canalispira olivellaeformis =

Species of gastropod

Canalispira olivellaeformis is a species of sea snail, a marine gastropod mollusk, in the family Cystiscidae.
