= Canalispira replicata =

Scientific classification
- Kingdom: Animalia
- Phylum: Mollusca
- Class: Gastropoda
- Subclass: Caenogastropoda
- Order: Neogastropoda
- Family: Cystiscidae
- Subfamily: Canalispirinae
- Genus: Canalispira
- Species: C. replicata

Binomial name
- Canalispira replicata (Melvill, 1912)

Synonyms
- Marginella replicata Melvill, 1912

Species of gastropod

Canalispira replicata is a species of sea snail, a marine gastropod mollusk, in the family Cystiscidae.
