= Osvaldoginella alejandrae =

Scientific classification
- Kingdom: Animalia
- Phylum: Mollusca
- Class: Gastropoda
- Subclass: Caenogastropoda
- Order: Neogastropoda
- Family: Cystiscidae
- Subfamily: Persiculinae
- Genus: Osvaldoginella
- Species: O. alejandrae

Binomial name
- Osvaldoginella alejandrae Espinosa & Ortea, 2014

Species of gastropod

Osvaldoginella alejandrae is a species of sea snail, a marine gastropod mollusk, in the family Cystiscidae.

== Distribution ==
This species occurs in Cuba.
