= Canalispira kerni =

Scientific classification
- Kingdom: Animalia
- Phylum: Mollusca
- Class: Gastropoda
- Subclass: Caenogastropoda
- Order: Neogastropoda
- Family: Cystiscidae
- Genus: Canalispira
- Species: C. kerni

Binomial name
- Canalispira kerni Garcia, 2007

Species of gastropod

Canalispira kerni is a species of very small sea snail, a marine gastropod mollusk or micromollusk in the family Cystiscidae.

== Description ==
Canalispira kerni has a strong, smooth, ivory-colored shell. The shell's surface has yellowish flammules on it. Its spire is 1.84 millimetres (0.072 in) long. Its protoconch is dome shaped and white. The shell's aperture is 3.26 millimetres (0.128 in) long.
