= Canalispira infirma =

Scientific classification
- Kingdom: Animalia
- Phylum: Mollusca
- Class: Gastropoda
- Subclass: Caenogastropoda
- Order: Neogastropoda
- Family: Cystiscidae
- Subfamily: Canalispirinae
- Genus: Canalispira
- Species: C. infirma

Binomial name
- Canalispira infirma (Laseron, 1957)

Synonyms
- Baroginella infirma Laseron, 1957

Species of gastropod

Canalispira infirma is a species of sea snail, a marine gastropod mollusk, in the family Cystiscidae.
