= Canalispira lipei =

Scientific classification
- Kingdom: Animalia
- Phylum: Mollusca
- Class: Gastropoda
- Subclass: Caenogastropoda
- Order: Neogastropoda
- Family: Cystiscidae
- Genus: Canalispira
- Species: C. lipei

Binomial name
- Canalispira lipei Garcia, 2007

Species of gastropod

Canalispira lipei is a species of very small sea snail, a marine gastropod mollusk or micromollusk in the family Cystiscidae.

== Description ==
Canalispira lipei is classified as a Neogastropoda. Typically living in the demersal zone with a depth range of 75-100m. Members of the order Neogastropoda are mostly gonochoric and broadcast spawners. Life cycle: Embryos develop into planktonic trochophore larvae and later into juvenile veligers before becoming fully grown adults.

== Distribution ==
Western Atlantic.
