= Canalispira fallax =

Scientific classification
- Kingdom: Animalia
- Phylum: Mollusca
- Class: Gastropoda
- Subclass: Caenogastropoda
- Order: Neogastropoda
- Family: Cystiscidae
- Subfamily: Canalispirinae
- Genus: Canalispira
- Species: C. fallax

Binomial name
- Canalispira fallax (E. A. Smith, 1903)

Synonyms
- Marginella fallax E. A. Smith, 1903

Species of gastropod

Canalispira fallax is a species of sea snail, a marine gastropod mollusk, in the family Cystiscidae.
