= Ticofurcilla tica =

Scientific classification
- Kingdom: Animalia
- Phylum: Mollusca
- Class: Gastropoda
- Subclass: Caenogastropoda
- Order: Neogastropoda
- Family: Cystiscidae
- Genus: Ticofurcilla
- Species: T. tica

Binomial name
- Ticofurcilla tica Espinosa & Ortea, 2002

Synonyms
- Furcilla tica Espinosa & Ortea, 2000

Species of gastropod

Ticofurcilla tica is a species of very small sea snail, a marine gastropod mollusk or micromollusk in the family Cystiscidae.
