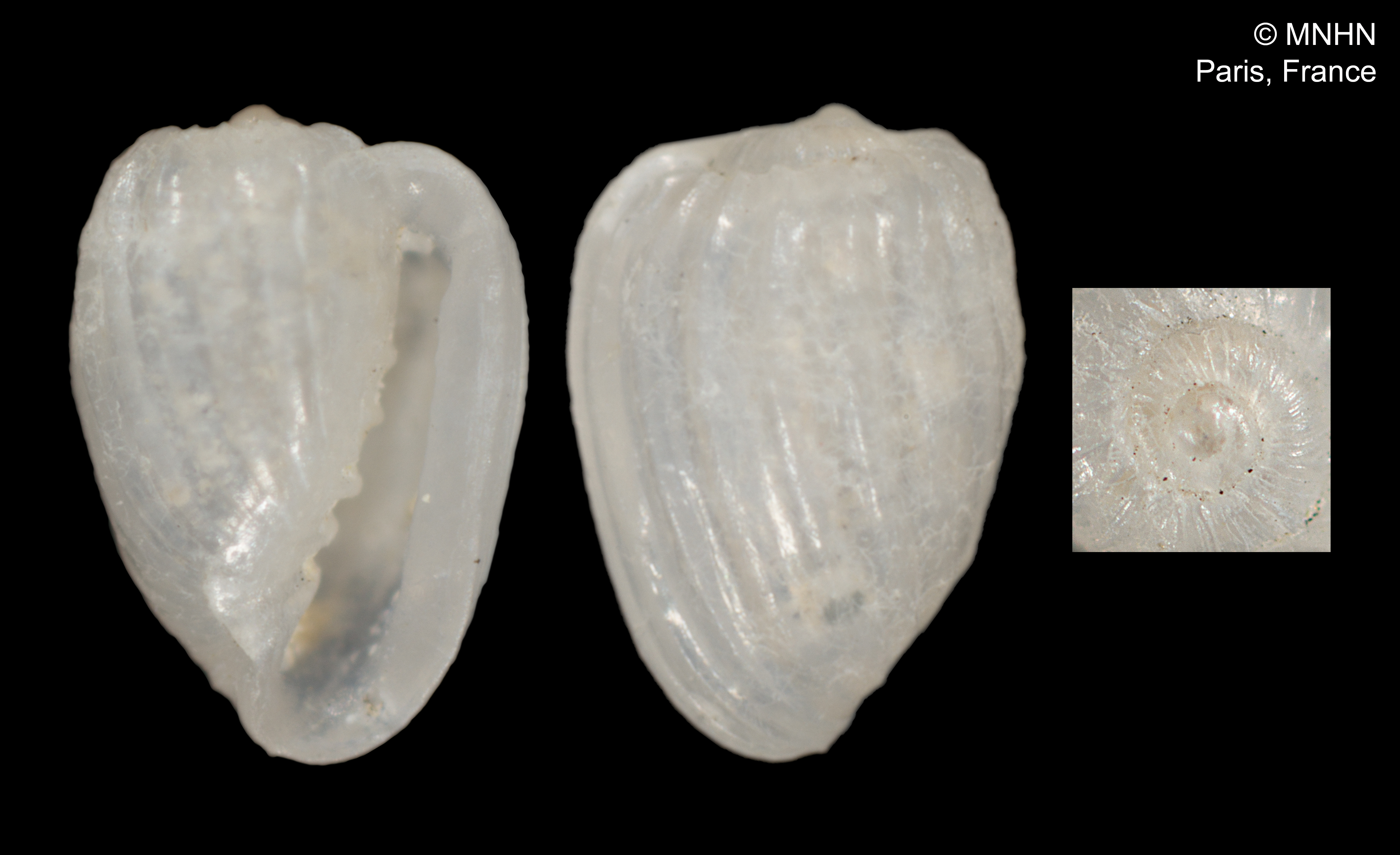

Scientific classification
- Kingdom: Animalia
- Phylum: Mollusca
- Class: Gastropoda
- Subclass: Caenogastropoda
- Order: Neogastropoda
- Family: Cystiscidae
- Subfamily: Cystiscinae
- Genus: Extra
- Species: E. extra

Binomial name
- Extra extra (Jousseaume, 1894)

Synonyms
- Marginella extra Jousseaume, 1894

= Extra extra =

Species of gastropod

Extra extra or Marginella extra is a species of small sea snail, a marine gastropod mollusk or micromollusk in the family Cystiscidae. Some malacologists place this genus more simply in the family Marginellidae.

== Taxonomy ==
Marginella extra was originally described under name Extra extra by French zoologist Félix Pierre Jousseaume in 1894. He placed this species to the monotypic genus Extra Jousseaume, 1894. Dautzenberg (1929) moved this species into genus Marginella.

== Diagnosis ==
The shell is minute, white, semitranslucent; prominent axial costae present; spire sunken but not immersed; lip strongly thickened, smooth, lacking denticulation, flared posteriorly; siphonal notch absent; posterior notch absent; distinct parietal callus "shield" present; columella multiplicate, with 5 plications plus parietal lirae, plications slightly excavated inside aperture due to parietal callus deposits.

== Distribution and habitat ==
Recorded only from western Indian Ocean along Madagascar, apparently in shallow water.
