= Osvaldoginella phantasia =

Scientific classification
- Kingdom: Animalia
- Phylum: Mollusca
- Class: Gastropoda
- Subclass: Caenogastropoda
- Order: Neogastropoda
- Family: Cystiscidae
- Subfamily: Persiculinae
- Genus: Osvaldoginella
- Species: O. phantasia

Binomial name
- Osvaldoginella phantasia (McCleery & Wakefield, 2007)

Synonyms
- Canalispira phantasia McCleery & Wakefield, 2007

Species of gastropod

Osvaldoginella phantasia is a species of very small sea snail, a marine gastropod mollusk or micromollusk in the family Cystiscidae.
