= Osvaldoginella gomezi =

Scientific classification
- Kingdom: Animalia
- Phylum: Mollusca
- Class: Gastropoda
- Subclass: Caenogastropoda
- Order: Neogastropoda
- Family: Cystiscidae
- Genus: Osvaldoginella
- Species: O. gomezi

Binomial name
- Osvaldoginella gomezi Espinosa & Ortea, 1997

Synonyms
- Canalispira gomezi (Espinosa & Ortea, 1997); Canalispira ornata McCleery & Wakefield, 2007 (original combination)

Species of gastropod

Osvaldoginella gomezi is a species of small sea snail, a marine gastropod mollusk or micromollusk in the family Cystiscidae.

== Description ==
The shell of this species grows to a length of 3 mm.

== Distribution ==
This species occurs in Tropical Western Atlantic water of Caribbean Sea at Cuba, and in the Gulf of Mexico.
