= Osvaldoginella fluctuata =

Scientific classification
- Kingdom: Animalia
- Phylum: Mollusca
- Class: Gastropoda
- Subclass: Caenogastropoda
- Order: Neogastropoda
- Family: Cystiscidae
- Genus: Osvaldoginella
- Species: O. fluctuata

Binomial name
- Osvaldoginella fluctuata (McCleery & Wakefield, 2007)

Synonyms
- Canalispira fluctuata McCleery & Wakefield, 2007 (original combination)

Species of gastropod

Osvaldoginella fluctuata is a species of very small sea snail, a marine gastropod mollusc or micromollusc in the family Cystiscidae.
