= Ticofurcilla =

Scientific classification
- Kingdom: Animalia
- Phylum: Mollusca
- Class: Gastropoda
- Subclass: Caenogastropoda
- Order: Neogastropoda
- Family: Cystiscidae
- Subfamily: Cystiscinae
- Genus: Ticofurcilla; Espinosa & Ortea, 2002

Synonyms
- Furcilla Espinosa & Ortea, 2000

Genus of gastropods

Ticofurcilla is a genus of very small sea snails, marine gastropod mollusks or micromollusks in the family Cystiscidae.

== Species ==
Species within the genus Ticofurcilla include:

- Ticofurcilla tica Espinosa & Ortea, 2002
