= Osvaldoginella =

Scientific classification
- Kingdom: Animalia
- Phylum: Mollusca
- Class: Gastropoda
- Subclass: Caenogastropoda
- Order: Neogastropoda
- Family: Cystiscidae
- Subfamily: Persiculinae
- Genus: Osvaldoginella; Espinosa & Ortea, 1997

Genus of gastropods

Osvaldoginella is a genus of sea snails, marine gastropod mollusks in the family Cystiscidae.

== Species ==
Species within the genus Osvaldoginella include:

- Osvaldoginella acualina Espinosa & Ortea, 2018
- Osvaldoginella alejandrae Espinosa & Ortea, 2014
- Osvaldoginella cabera Espinosa & Ortea, 2018
- Osvaldoginella celisi Espinosa & Ortea, 2018
- Osvaldoginella columba Espinosa & Ortea, 2018
- Osvaldoginella fluctuata (McCleery & Wakefield, 2007)
- Osvaldoginella gomezi Espinosa & Ortea, 1997
- Osvaldoginella hoffi (Moolenbeek & Faber, 1991)
- Osvaldoginella jaguaella Espinosa & Ortea, 2018
- Osvaldoginella ornata (McCleery & Wakefield, 2007)
- Osvaldoginella phantasia (McCleery & Wakefield, 2007)
