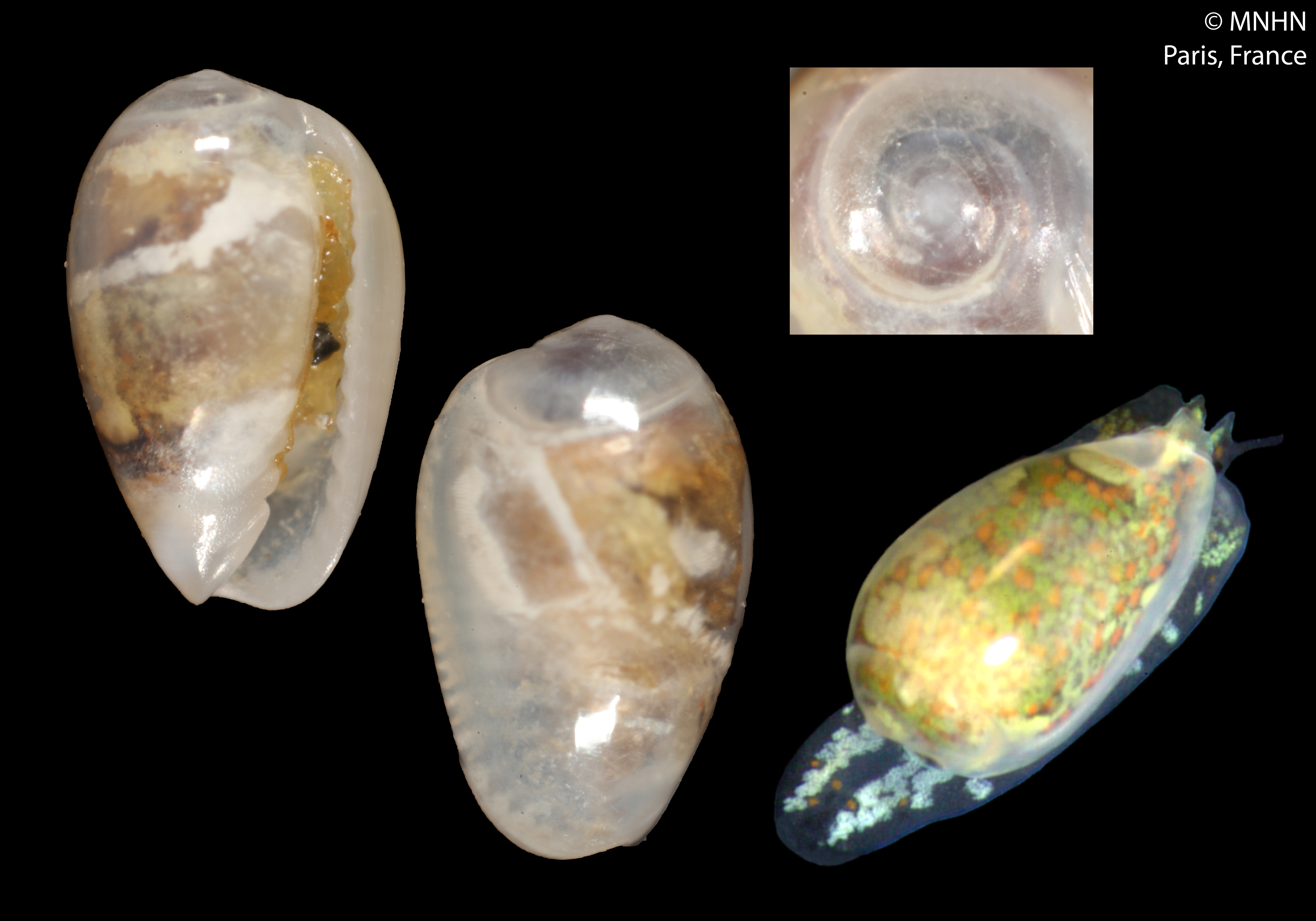
- Shell of Gibberula celerae (holotype at MNHN, Paris)

Scientific classification
- Kingdom: Animalia
- Phylum: Mollusca
- Class: Gastropoda
- Subclass: Caenogastropoda
- Order: Neogastropoda
- Family: Cystiscidae
- Subfamily: Cystiscinae
- Genus: Gibberula
- Species: G. celerae

Binomial name
- Gibberula celerae McCleery, 2008

= Gibberula celerae =

Species of gastropod

Gibberula celerae is a species of very small sea snail, a marine gastropod mollusc or micromollusc in the family Cystiscidae.

== Description ==
The length of the shell attains 2.02 mm.

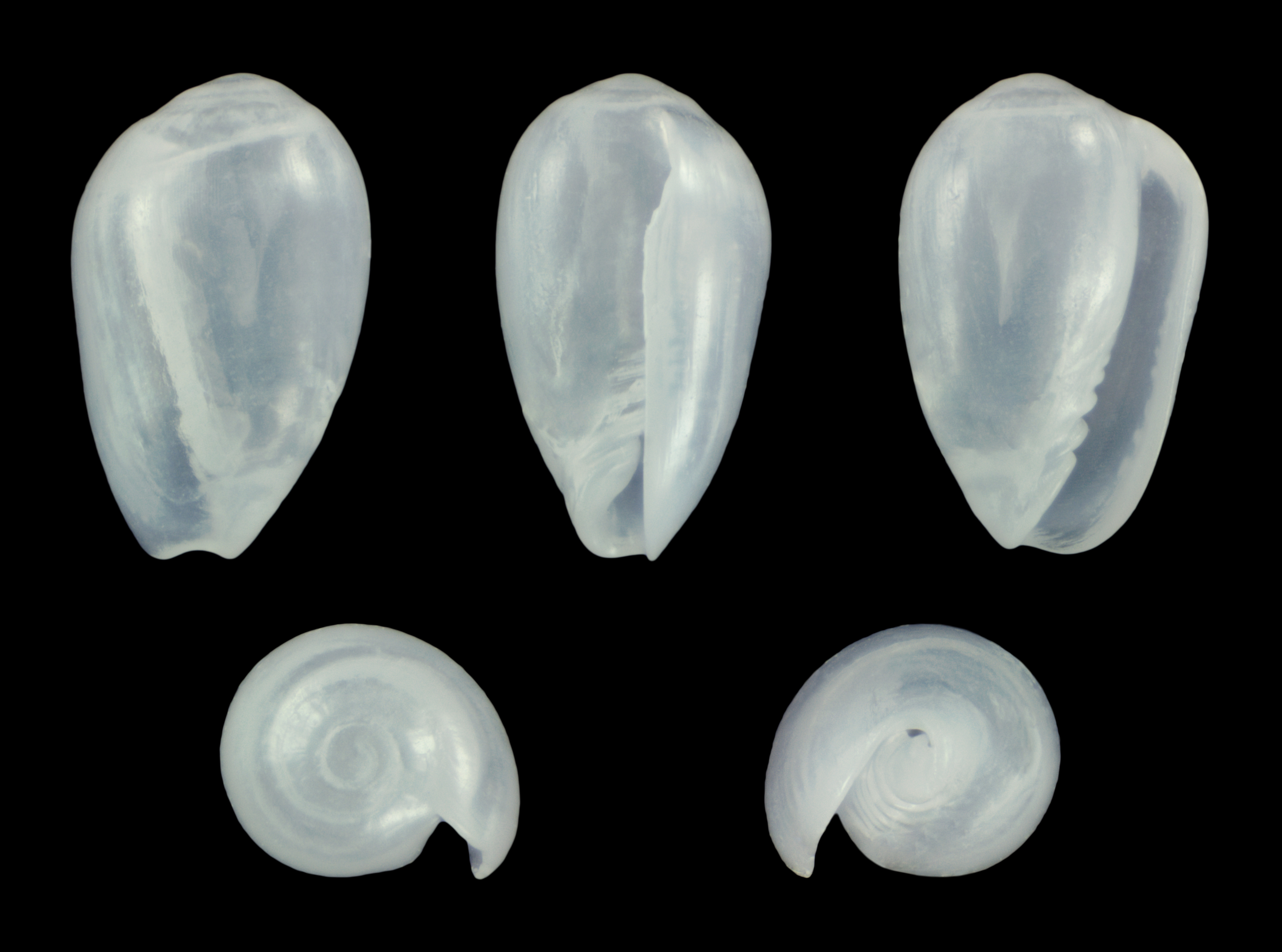

== Distribution ==
This species occurs in the Caribbean Sea off Venezuela.
