= Osvaldoginella hoffi =

Scientific classification
- Kingdom: Animalia
- Phylum: Mollusca
- Class: Gastropoda
- Subclass: Caenogastropoda
- Order: Neogastropoda
- Family: Cystiscidae
- Subfamily: Persiculinae
- Genus: Osvaldoginella
- Species: O. hoffi

Binomial name
- Osvaldoginella hoffi (Moolenbeek & Faber, 1991)

Synonyms
- Canalispira hoffi (Moolenbeek & Faber, 1991); Prunum hoffi Moolenbeek & Faber, 1991

Species of gastropod

Osvaldoginella hoffi is a species of sea snail, a marine gastropod mollusk, in the family Cystiscidae.
