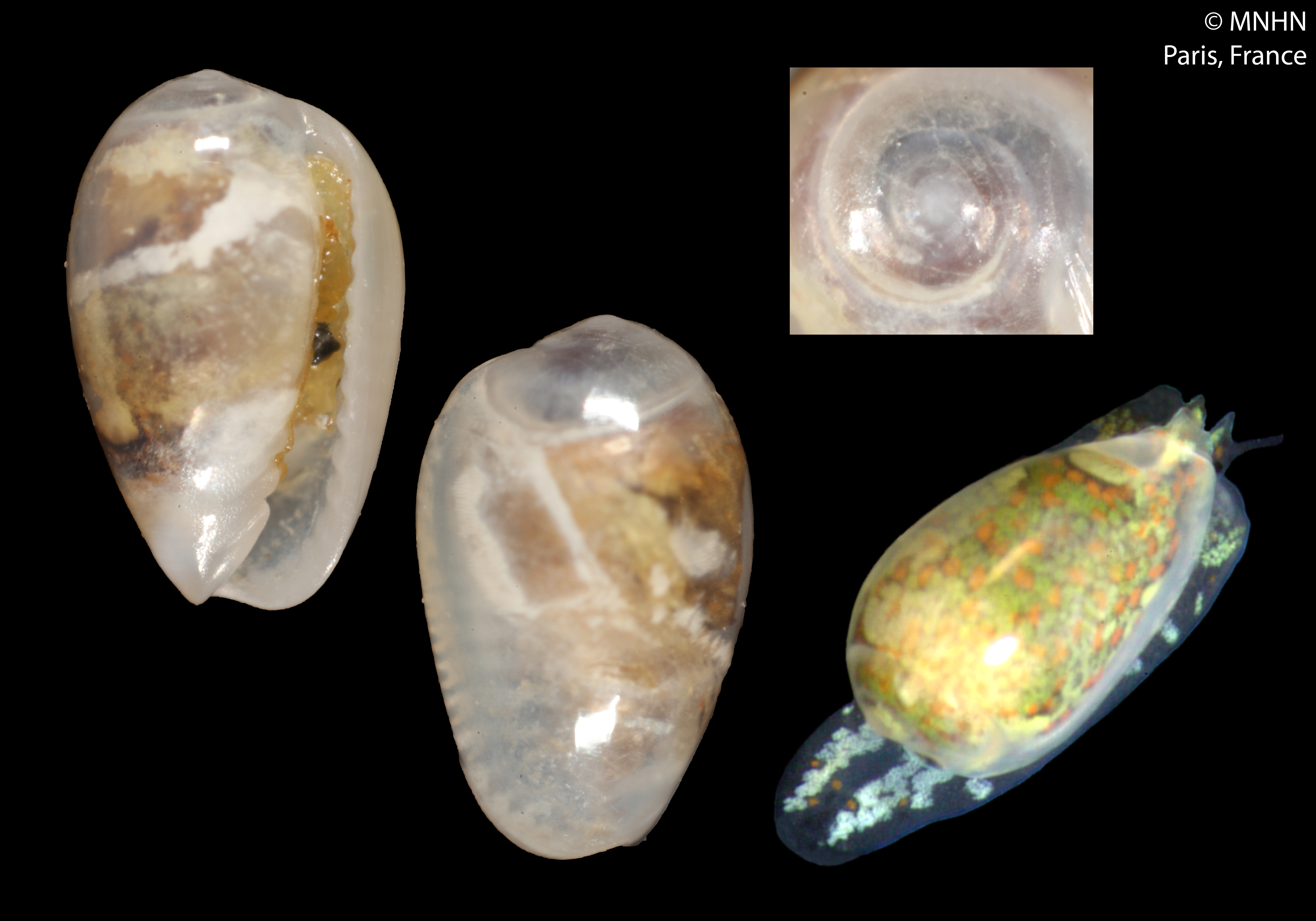
- Gibberula celerae

Scientific classification
- Kingdom: Animalia
- Phylum: Mollusca
- Class: Gastropoda
- Subclass: Caenogastropoda
- Order: Neogastropoda
- Family: Cystiscidae; Stimpson, 1865

= Cystiscidae =

Family of sea snails

Cystiscidae is a taxonomic family of small sea snails, marine gastropod mollusks or micromollusks.

== Description ==
The shell is minute to large, either white, uniformly colored, or patterned; the surface is smooth, sculptured, or axially costate; the spire is flat to immersed, or low to tall; the protoconch is paucispiral; the lip is thickened, smooth or denticulate; an external varix is present or absent; a siphonal notch is present or absent; a posterior notch is present or absent; the columella is multiplicate, internal whorls cystiscid or modified cystiscid type. Mantle cavity with monopectinate ctenidium and bipectinate osphradium. Proboscis pleurembolic; jaws absent; typical radular sac present.

== Taxonomy ==
The family was erected by William Stimpson for a single included species based on unusual features of the head and radula. Subsequent authors included this group in the family Marginellidae.

Coan (1965) recognized this group as a subfamily, but he did not include such genera as Gibberula, Persicula, and Canalispira. Rule of priority of the ICZN require that the name Cystiscidae must be used, but this is unfortunate because the type specimen of the type species is lost, and that species is poorly known.

=== 2005 taxonomy ===
The family Cystiscidae consists of subfamilies (according to the Working Classification of the Gastropoda by Bouchet et al., 2005):

- Canalispirinae Fedosov, Caballer & Bouchet, 2019
- Cystiscinae Stimpson, 1865
- Granulininae G.A. & H.K. Coovert, 1995
- Persiculinae G.A. & H.K. Coovert, 1995
- Plesiocystiscinae G.A. & H.K. Coovert, 1995

Reference for inclusion of Granulinae in Cystiscidae: Bouchet, P.; Rocroi, J.-P.; Fryda, J.; Hausdorf, B.; Ponder, W.; Valdes, A.; Waren, A. 2005. Classification and Nomenclator of Gastropod Families. Malacologia: International Journal of Malacology. Hackenheim, Germany: ConchBooks.

== Genera ==
Genera within the family Cystiscidae include:

Canalispirinae

- Canalispira Jousseaume, 1875:168,270
- Osvaldoginella Espinosa & Ortea, 1997

Cystiscinae

- †Topaginella Laseron, 1957:288
- Crithe Gould, 1860
- Cystiscus Stimpson, 1865:55
- Extra Jousseaume, 1894 - with the only species Extra extra Jousseaume, 1894
- Gibberula Swainson, 1840
- Inbiocystiscus Ortea and Espinosa, 2001
- Intelcystiscus Ortea and Espinosa, 2001
- †Marginocystiscus Landau, C. M. Silva & Heitz, 2016
- Pachybathron Gaskoin, 1853
- Persicula Schumacher, 1817
- Ticocystiscus Espinosa and Ortea, 2002
- Ticofurcilla Espinosa & Ortea, 2002

Synonyms

- Furcilla Espinosa & Ortea, 2000: synonym of Ticofurcilla Espinosa & Ortea, 2002 (Invalid: junior homonym of Furcilla Martin, 1975 [Diptera] and Furcilla Bakharev, 1988 [Ostracoda]; Ticofurcilla is a replacement name)
  - Furcilla tica Espinosa & Ortea, 2000: synonym of Ticofurcilla tica (Espinosa & Ortea, 2000)

Plesiocystiscinae

- Plesiocystiscus Coovert & Coovert, 1995

Abbreviations:

- (M) - original designation by monotype
- OD - original designation
- OD (M) - original designation as type species, but also monotypic
- SD - subsequent designation as type
- SD (M) - subsequent designation as type species, but also monotypic
- T - original designation by tautonomy

Comparisons of shells of the genera:

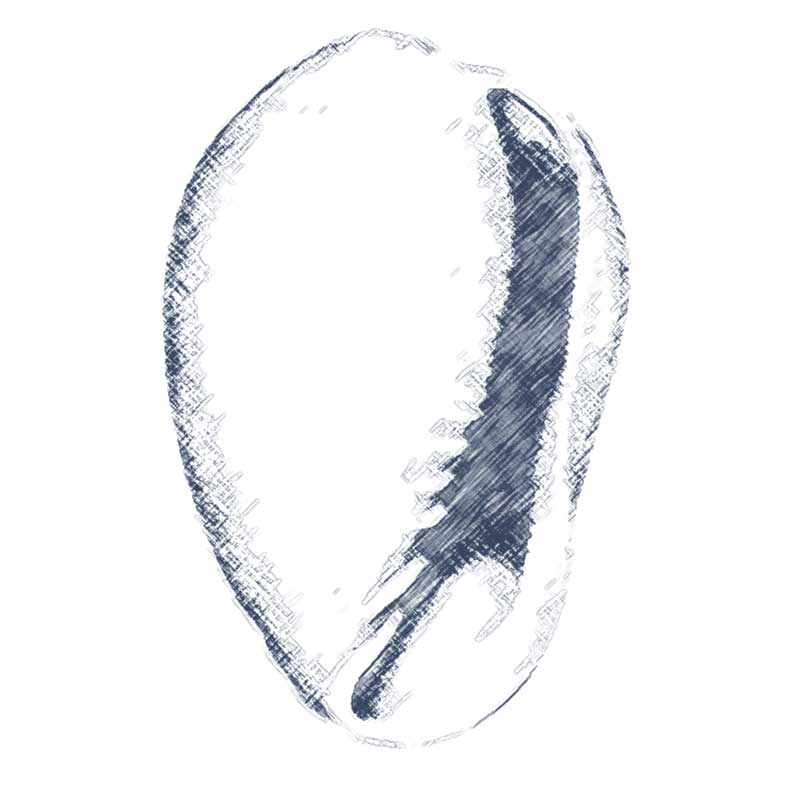
Plesiocystiscus

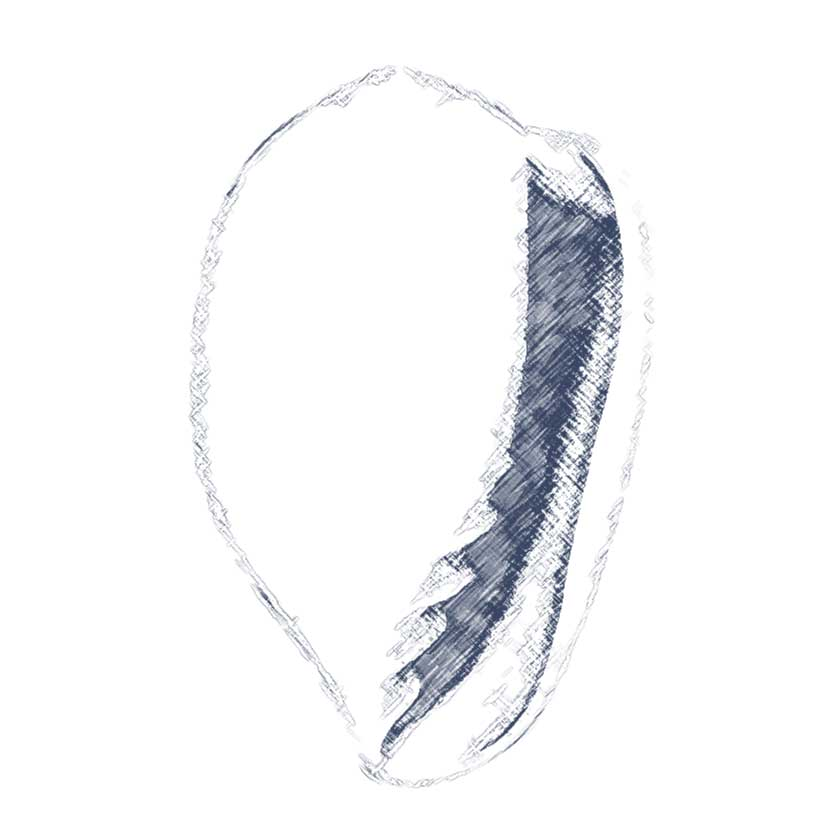
Cystiscus

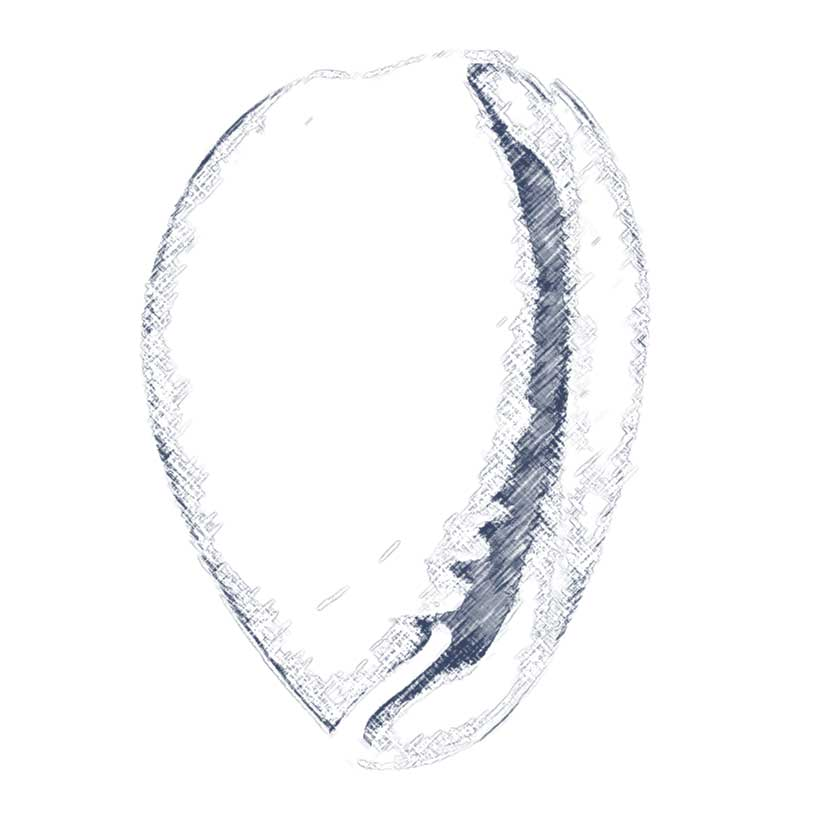
Crithe

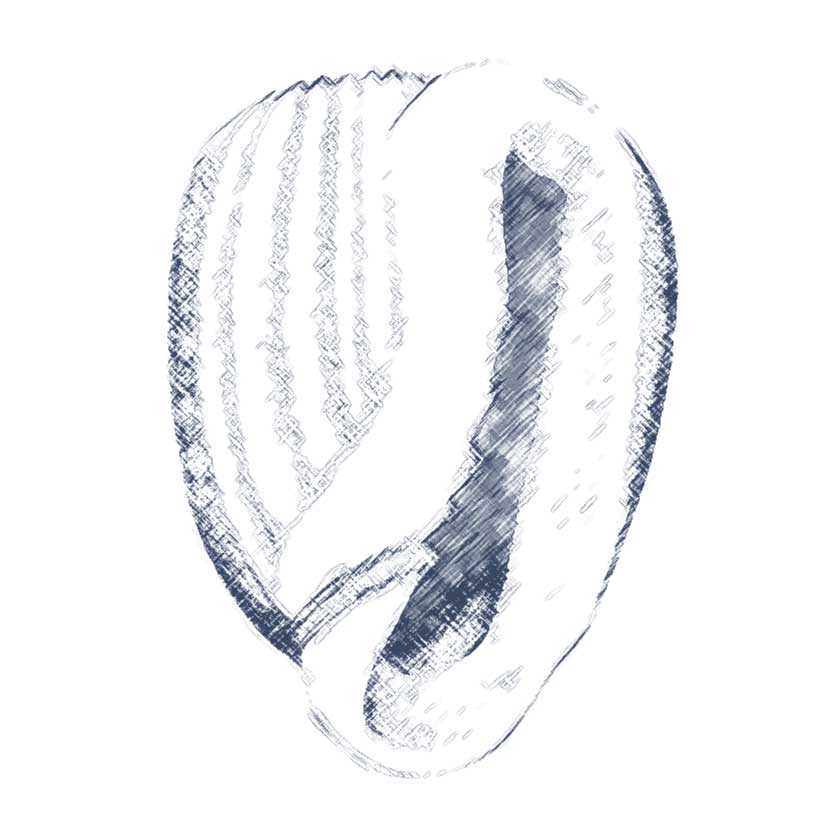
Extra extra

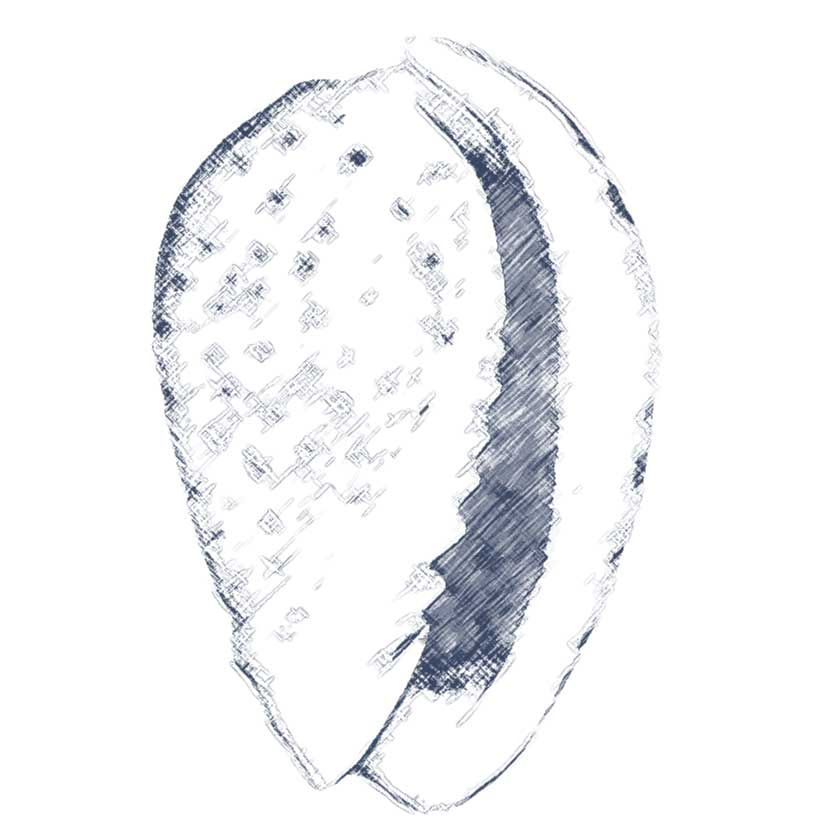
Persicula

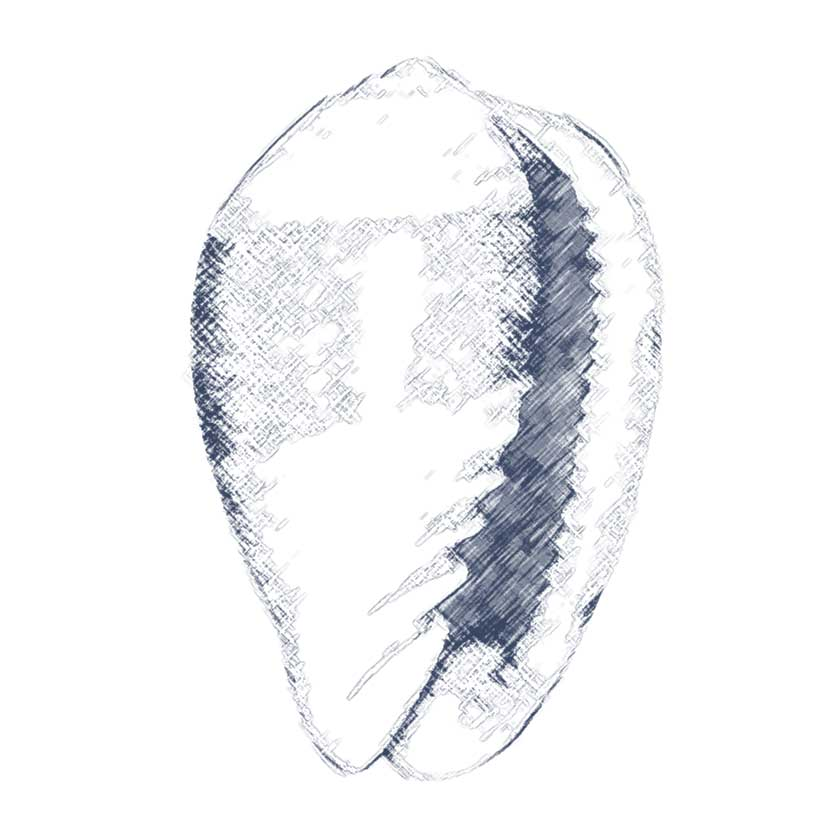
Gibberula

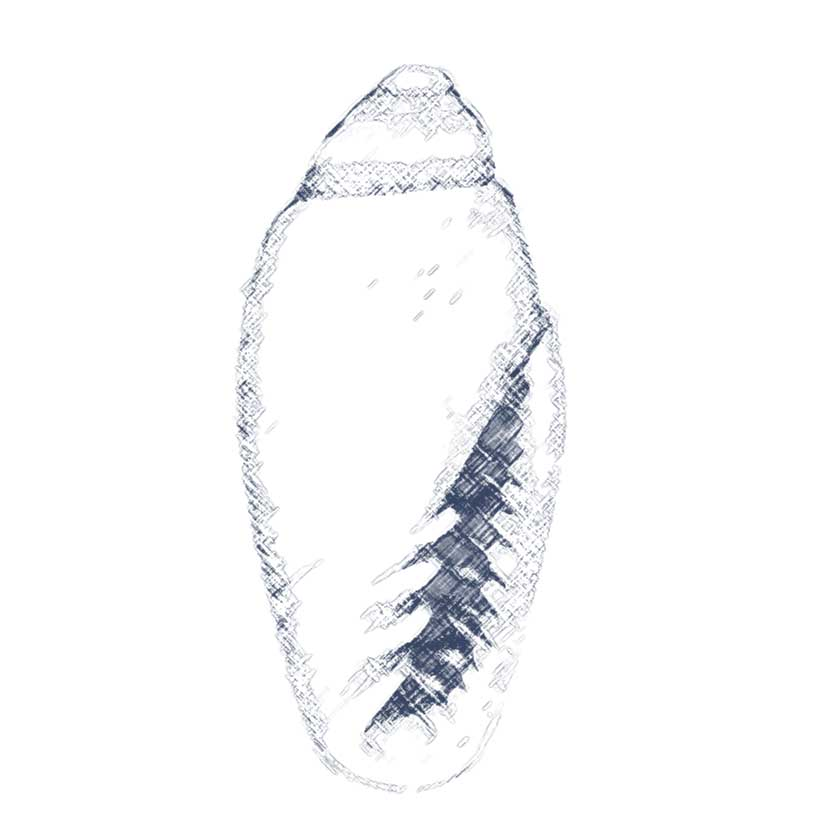
Canalispira

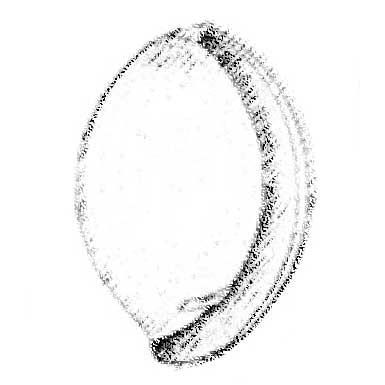
Furcilla

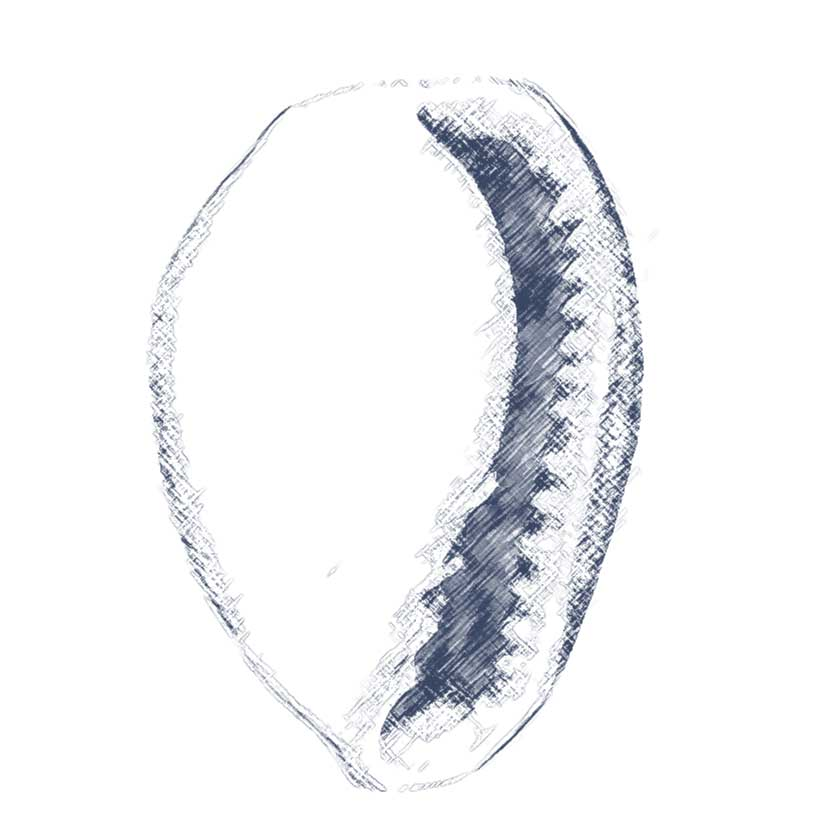
Granulina

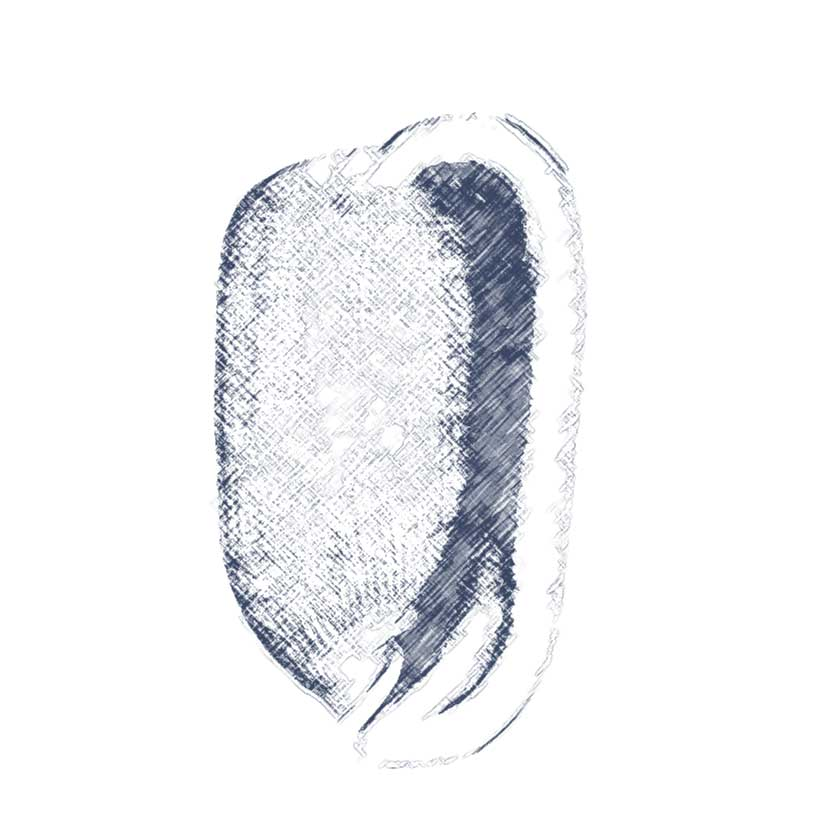
Pugnus
