= Volvarina kyprisae =

Scientific classification
- Kingdom: Animalia
- Phylum: Mollusca
- Class: Gastropoda
- Subclass: Caenogastropoda
- Order: Neogastropoda
- Family: Marginellidae
- Subfamily: Marginellinae
- Genus: Volvarina
- Species: V. kyprisae

Binomial name
- Volvarina kyprisae Espinosa, Ortea & Moro, 2013

Species of gastropod

Volvarina kyprisae is a species of sea snail, a marine gastropod mollusk in the family Marginellidae, the margin snails.

== Description ==
The length of the shell attains 15.2 mm, its diameter is 6.8 mm.

== Distribution ==
This marine species occurs off Fuerteventura, Canary Islands, Atlantic Ocean.
