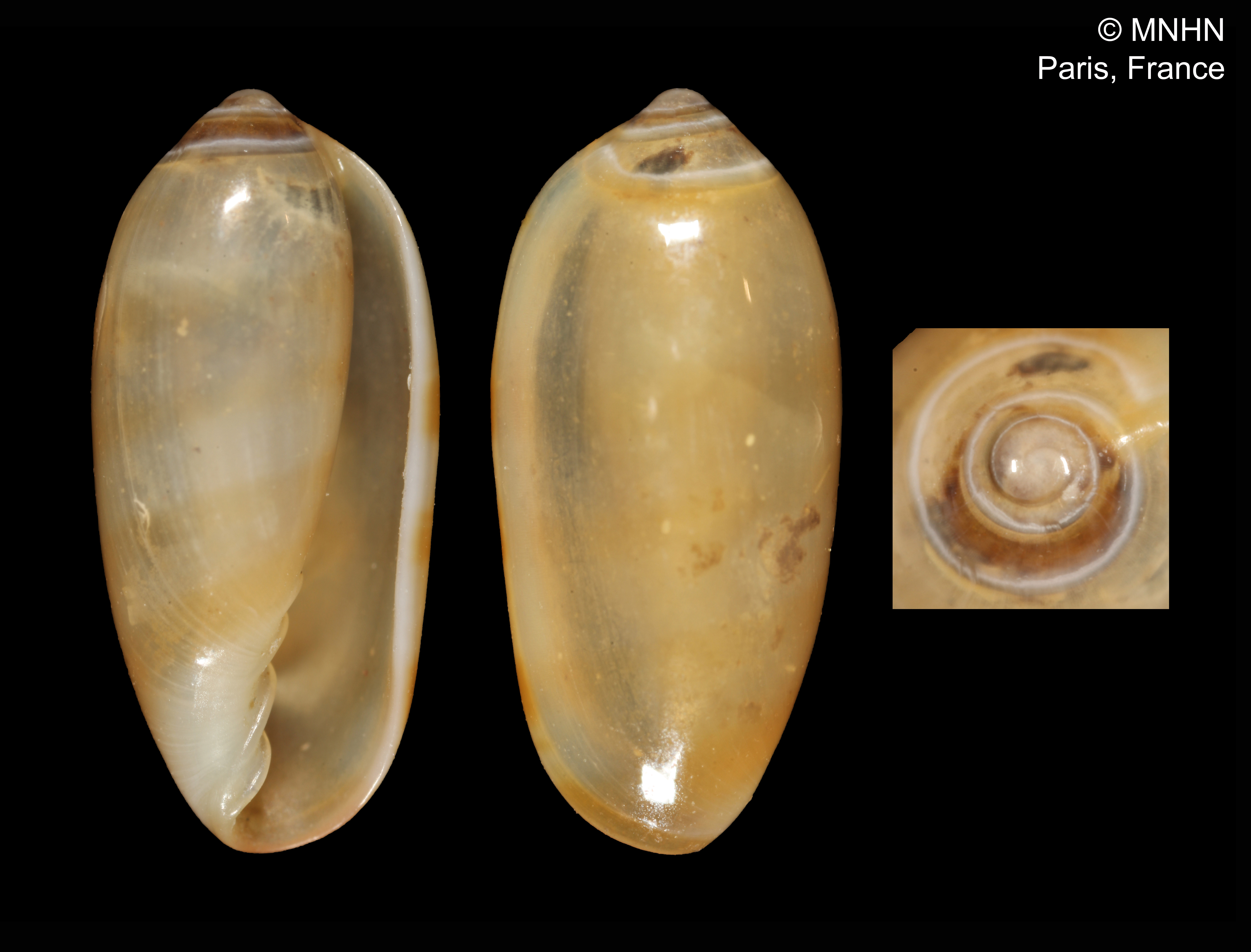
- Shell of Volvarina utgei (holotype at MNHN, Paris)

Scientific classification
- Kingdom: Animalia
- Phylum: Mollusca
- Class: Gastropoda
- Subclass: Caenogastropoda
- Order: Neogastropoda
- Family: Marginellidae
- Subfamily: Marginellinae
- Genus: Volvarina
- Species: V. utgei

Binomial name
- Volvarina utgei Espinosa & Ortea, 2012

= Volvarina utgei =

Species of gastropod

Volvarina utgei is a species of sea snail, a marine gastropod mollusk in the family Marginellidae, the margin snails.

== Description ==
The length of the shell attains 7.38 mm, its diameter is 3.36 mm.

== Distribution ==
This marine species occurs off Guadeloupe in the Caribbean Sea.
