= Volvarina pauli =

Scientific classification
- Kingdom: Animalia
- Phylum: Mollusca
- Class: Gastropoda
- Subclass: Caenogastropoda
- Order: Neogastropoda
- Family: Marginellidae
- Subfamily: Marginellinae
- Genus: Volvarina
- Species: V. pauli

Binomial name
- Volvarina pauli De Jong & Coomans, 1988

Species of gastropod

Volvarina pauli is a species of sea snail, a marine gastropod mollusk in the family Marginellidae, the margin snails.

== Description ==
The length of the shell attains 5.5 mm, its diameter 2.5 mm.

== Distribution ==
This marine species occurs in the Caribbean Sea, off Aruba and Curaçao.
