= Volvarina jordani =

Scientific classification
- Kingdom: Animalia
- Phylum: Mollusca
- Class: Gastropoda
- Subclass: Caenogastropoda
- Order: Neogastropoda
- Family: Marginellidae
- Subfamily: Marginellinae
- Genus: Volvarina
- Species: V. jordani

Binomial name
- Volvarina jordani Espinosa, Ortea & Moro, 2014

Species of gastropod

Volvarina jordani is a species of sea snail, a marine gastropod mollusk in the family Marginellidae, the margin snails.

== Description ==
The length of the shell attains 11.1 mm, its diameter 4.73 mm.

== Distribution ==
This marine species occurs off Fuerteventura, the Canary Islands, Atlantic Ocean.
