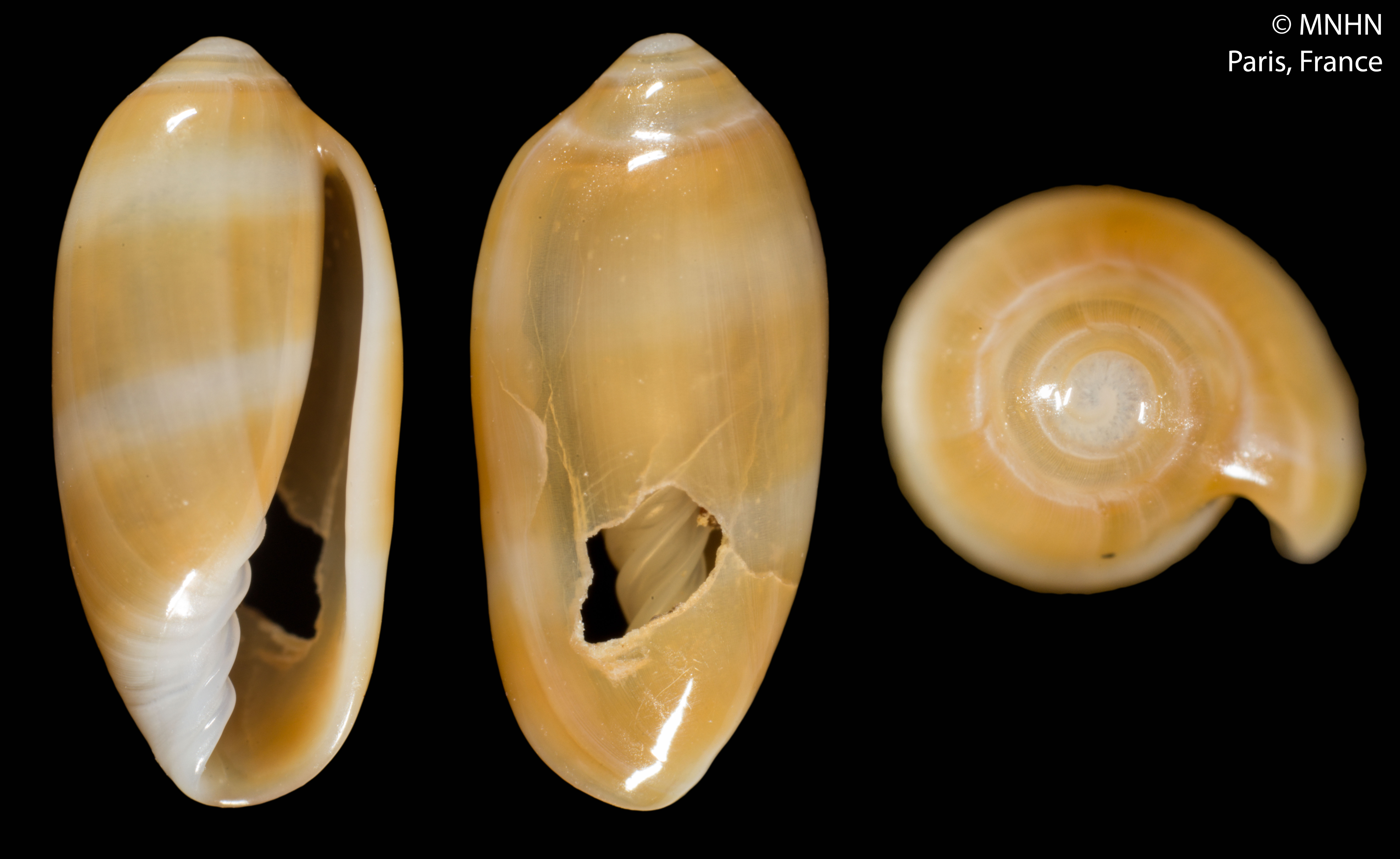
- Shell of Volvarina oceanica (holotype at MNHN, Paris)

Scientific classification
- Kingdom: Animalia
- Phylum: Mollusca
- Class: Gastropoda
- Subclass: Caenogastropoda
- Order: Neogastropoda
- Family: Marginellidae
- Subfamily: Marginellinae
- Genus: Volvarina
- Species: V. oceanica

Binomial name
- Volvarina oceanica Gofas, 1989

Synonyms
- Volvarina (Atlantivolva) oceanica Gofas, 1989 · alternate representation

= Volvarina oceanica =

Species of gastropod

Volvarina oceanica is a species of sea snail, a marine gastropod mollusk in the family Marginellidae, the margin snails.

== Description ==
The length of the shell attains 3 mm.

== Distribution ==
This marine species occurs in the Atlantic Ocean off the Azores.
