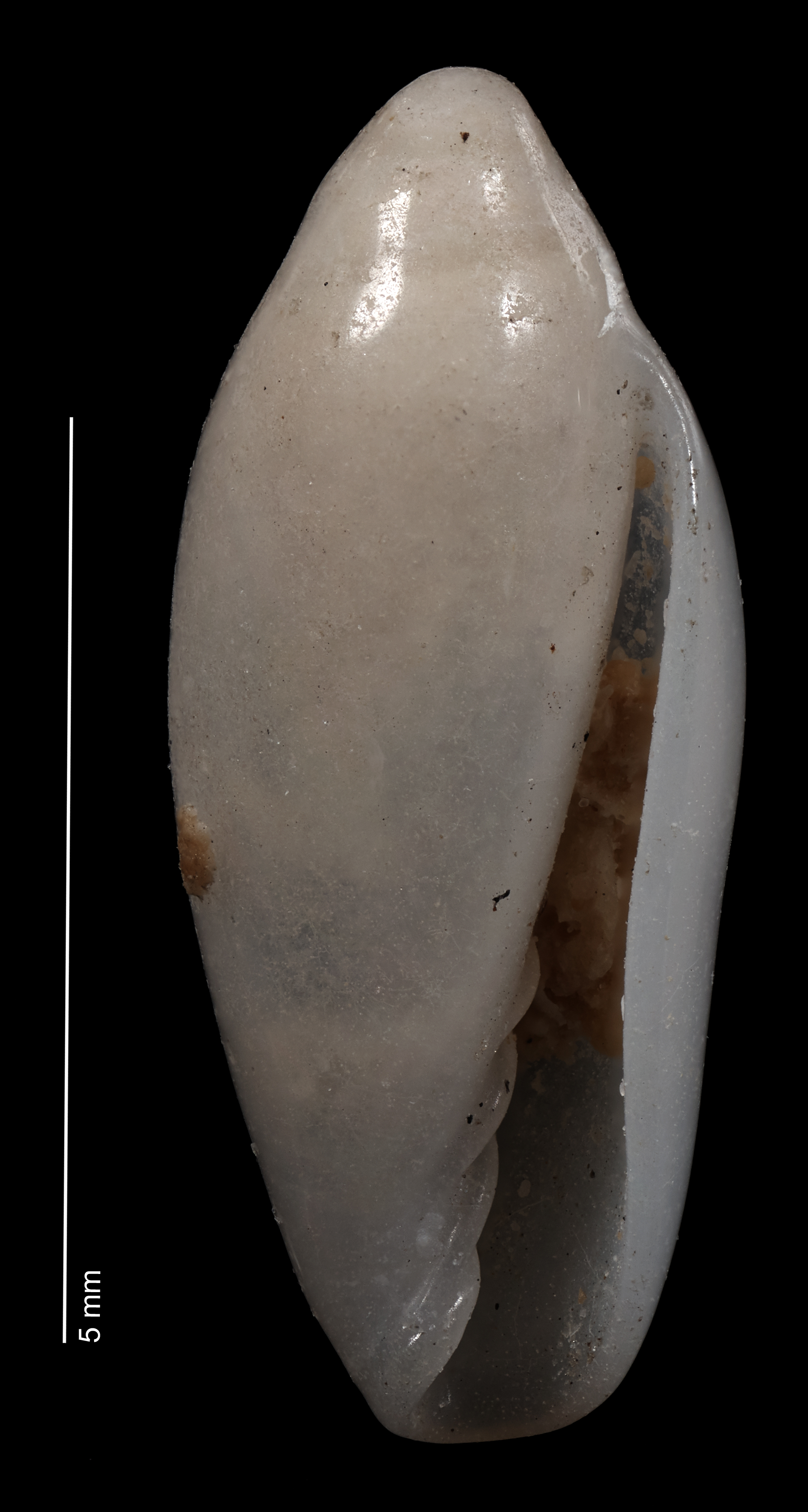
- Shell of Volvarina gabriellae (holotype at MNHN, Paris)

Scientific classification
- Kingdom: Animalia
- Phylum: Mollusca
- Class: Gastropoda
- Subclass: Caenogastropoda
- Order: Neogastropoda
- Family: Marginellidae
- Subfamily: Marginellinae
- Genus: Volvarina
- Species: V. gabriellae

Binomial name
- Volvarina gabriellae T. Cossignani, 2020

= Volvarina gabriellae =

Species of gastropod

Volvarina gabriellae is a species of sea snail, a marine gastropod mollusk in the family Marginellidae, the margin snails.

== Distribution ==
This marine species occurs off New Caledonia.
