= Volvarina ericmonnieri =

Scientific classification
- Kingdom: Animalia
- Phylum: Mollusca
- Class: Gastropoda
- Subclass: Caenogastropoda
- Order: Neogastropoda
- Family: Marginellidae
- Subfamily: Marginellinae
- Genus: Volvarina
- Species: V. ericmonnieri

Binomial name
- Volvarina ericmonnieri Espinosa, J. Martin & Ortea, 2018

Species of gastropod

Volvarina ericmonnieri is a species of sea snail, a marine gastropod mollusk in the family Marginellidae, the margin snails.

== Distribution ==
This small marine species occurs off the Colombia, Caribbean Sea.
