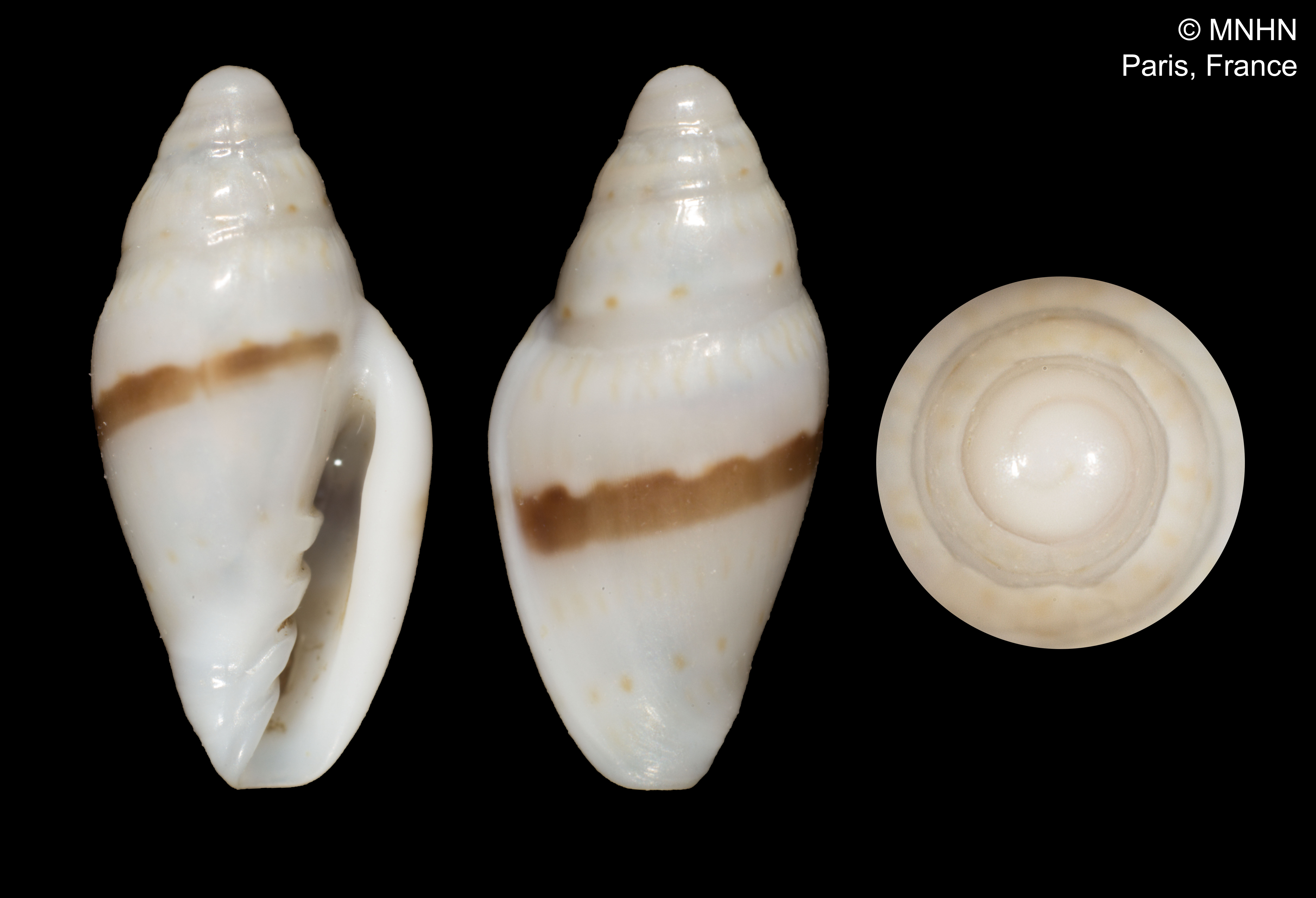
- Shell of Marginella joanae (holotype at MNHN, Paris)

Scientific classification
- Kingdom: Animalia
- Phylum: Mollusca
- Class: Gastropoda
- Subclass: Caenogastropoda
- Order: Neogastropoda
- Family: Marginellidae
- Subfamily: Marginellinae
- Genus: Marginella
- Species: M. joanae

Binomial name
- Marginella joanae Bozzetti, 2001

Synonyms
- Marginella (Praeparvamarginella) joanae Bozzetti, 2001· accepted, alternate representation

= Marginella joanae =

Species of gastropod

Marginella joanae is a species of sea snail, a marine gastropod mollusk in the family Marginellidae, the margin snails.

== Distribution ==
This marine species occurs off Mozambique.
