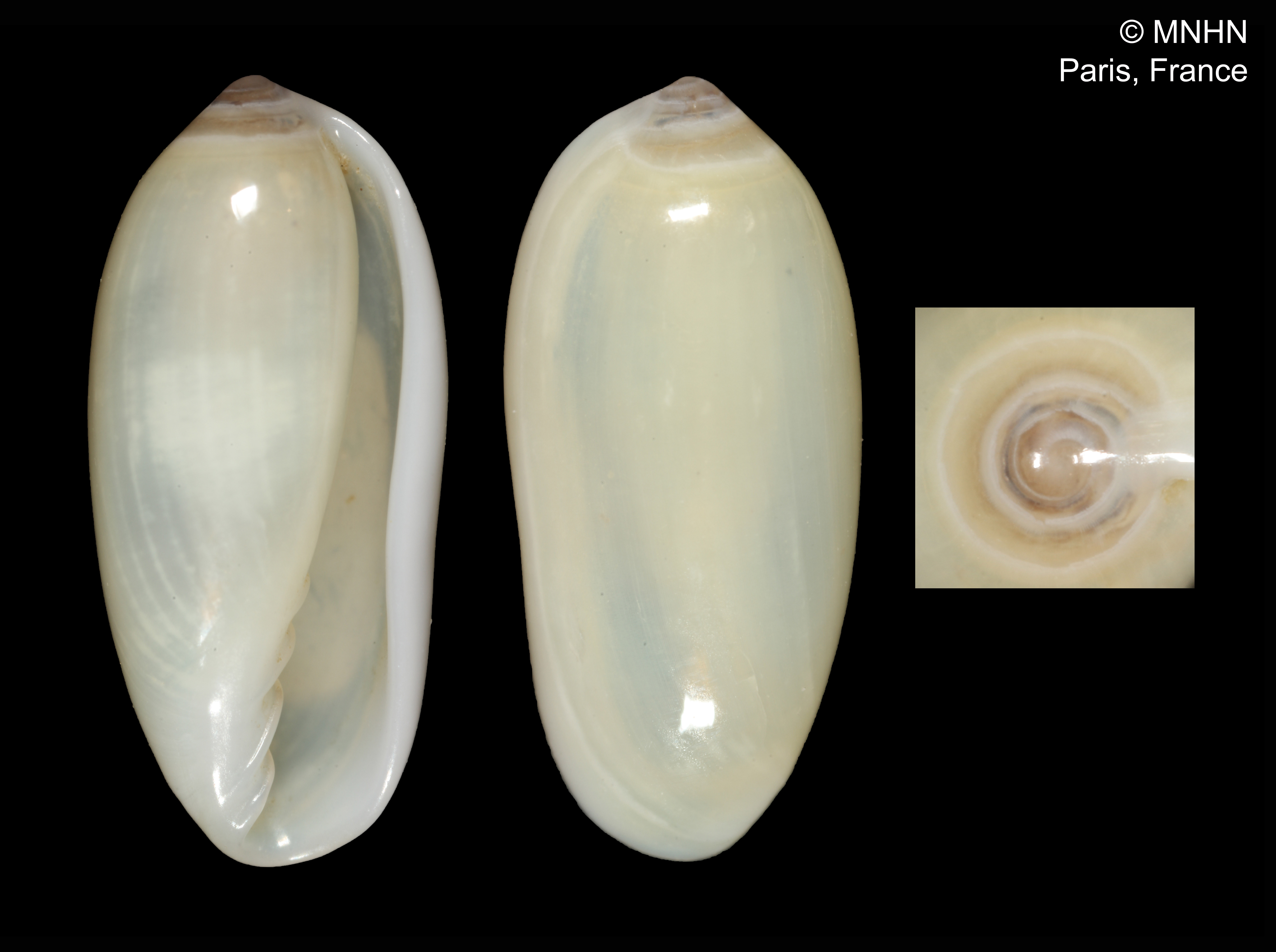
- Shell of Volvarina vassardi (holotype at MNHN, Paris)

Scientific classification
- Kingdom: Animalia
- Phylum: Mollusca
- Class: Gastropoda
- Subclass: Caenogastropoda
- Order: Neogastropoda
- Family: Marginellidae
- Subfamily: Marginellinae
- Genus: Volvarina
- Species: V. vassardi

Binomial name
- Volvarina vassardi Espinosa & Ortea, 2012

Synonyms
- Volvarina (Atlantivolva) vassardi Espinosa & Ortea, 2012 · alternate representation

= Volvarina vassardi =

Species of gastropod

Volvarina vassardi is a species of sea snail, a marine gastropod mollusk in the family Marginellidae, the margin snails.

== Description ==
The length of the shell attains 8.33 mm, its diameter is 3.78 mm.

== Distribution ==
This marine species occurs off Guadeloupe in the Caribbean Sea.
