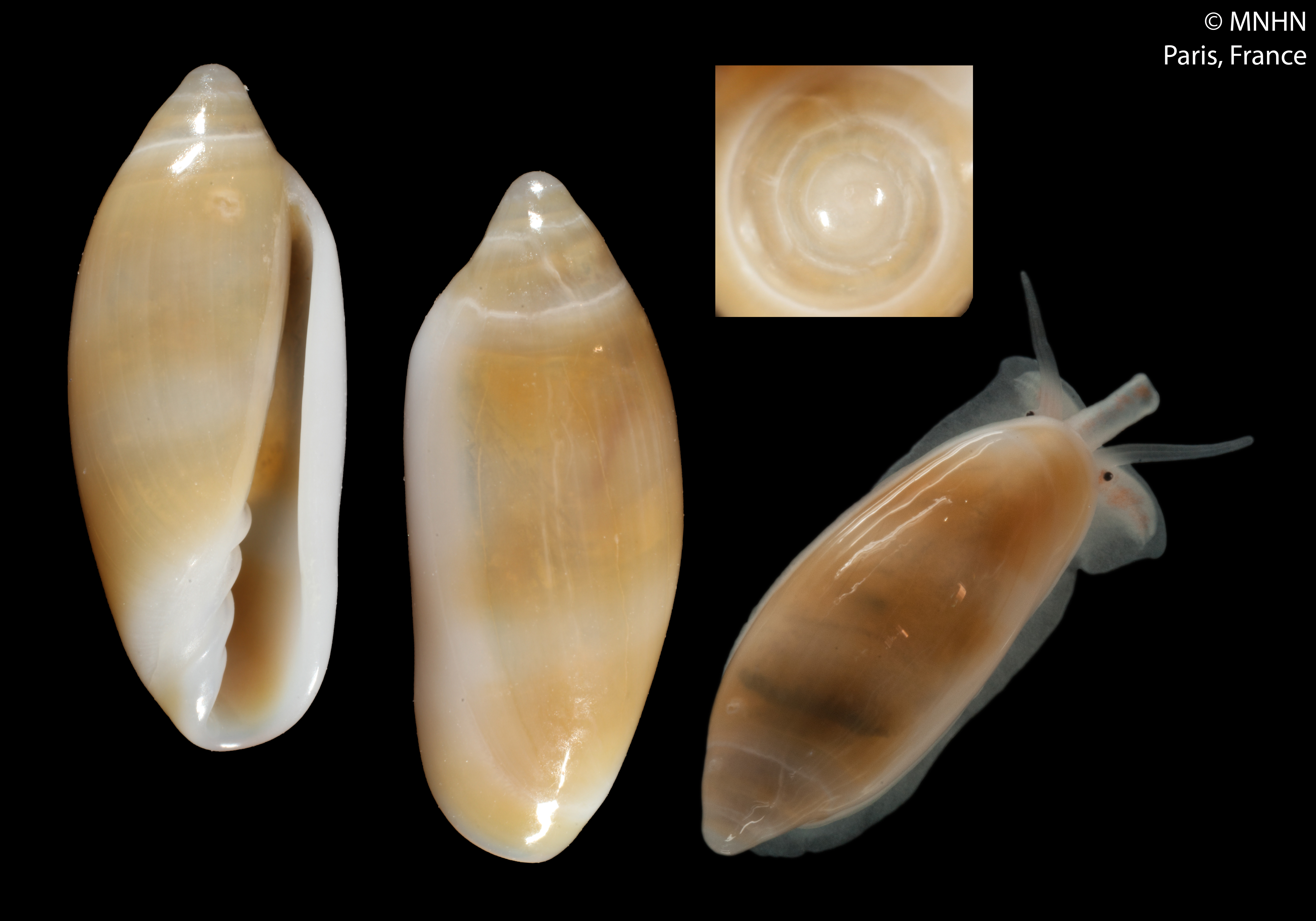
- Shell and animal of Volvarina lineae (holotype at MNHN, Paris)

Scientific classification
- Kingdom: Animalia
- Phylum: Mollusca
- Class: Gastropoda
- Subclass: Caenogastropoda
- Order: Neogastropoda
- Family: Marginellidae
- Subfamily: Marginellinae
- Genus: Volvarina
- Species: V. lineae

Binomial name
- Volvarina lineae Espinosa & Ortea, 2012

= Volvarina lineae =

Species of gastropod

Volvarina lineae is a species of sea snail, a marine gastropod mollusk in the family Marginellidae, the margin snails.

== Description ==
The length of the shell attains 10.19 mm, its diameter is 4.11 mm.

== Distribution ==
This marine species occurs off Guadeloupe in the Caribbean Sea.
