= Volvarina incommoda =

Scientific classification
- Kingdom: Animalia
- Phylum: Mollusca
- Class: Gastropoda
- Subclass: Caenogastropoda
- Order: Neogastropoda
- Family: Marginellidae
- Subfamily: Marginellinae
- Genus: Volvarina
- Species: †V. incommoda

Binomial name
- †Volvarina incommoda Ludbrook, 1958

Species of gastropod

Volvarina incommoda is an extinct species of sea snail, a marine gastropod mollusk in the family Marginellidae, the margin snails.

== Description ==
The length of the shell attains 6.3 mm, its diameter 3.3 mm.

== Distribution ==
Fossils of this marine species were found in the Pliocene strata in South Australia.
