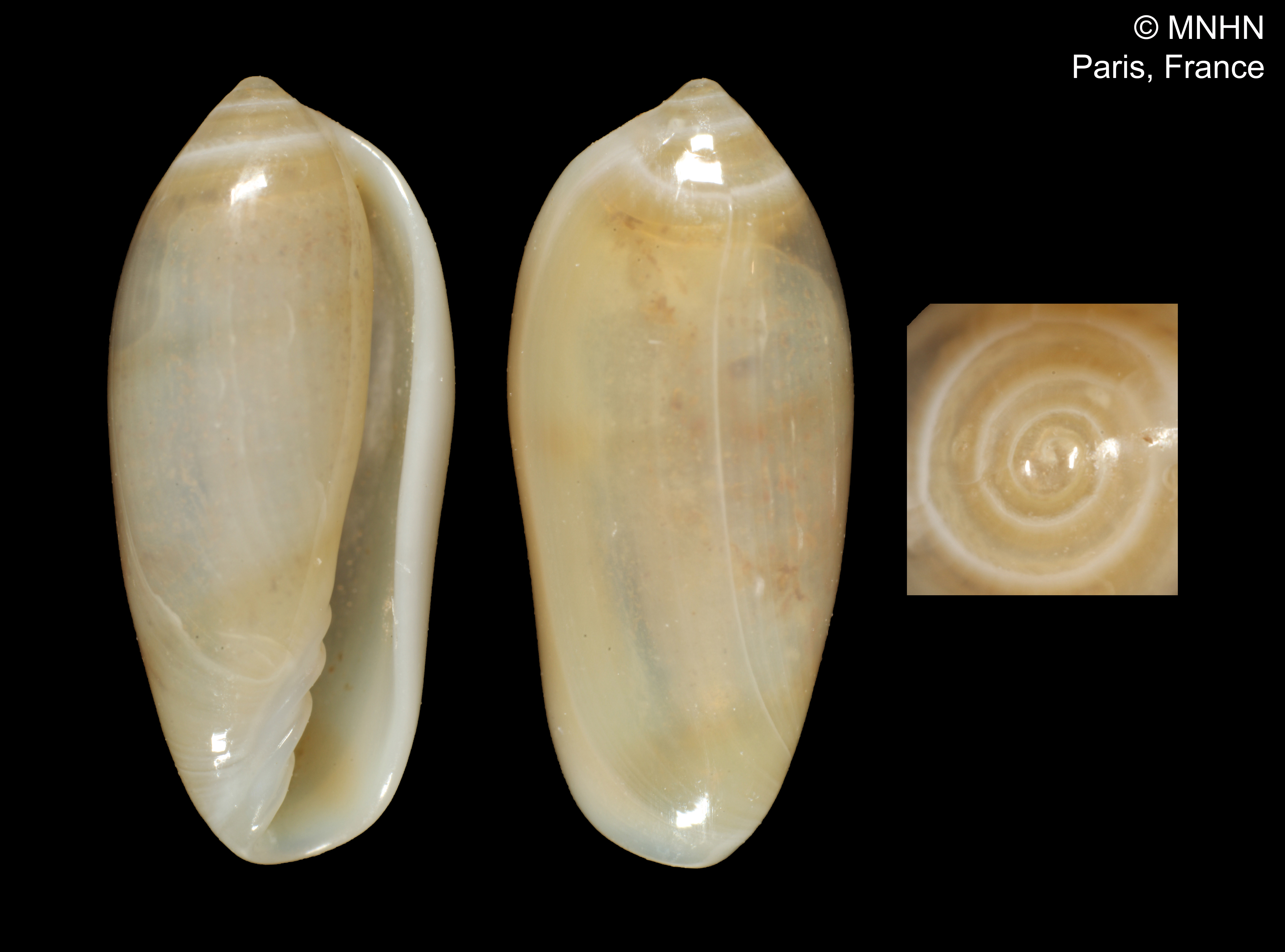
- Shell of Volvarina snyderi (holotype at MNHN, Paris)

Scientific classification
- Kingdom: Animalia
- Phylum: Mollusca
- Class: Gastropoda
- Subclass: Caenogastropoda
- Order: Neogastropoda
- Family: Marginellidae
- Subfamily: Marginellinae
- Genus: Volvarina
- Species: V. snyderi

Binomial name
- Volvarina snyderi Espinosa & Ortea, 2012

= Volvarina snyderi =

Species of gastropod

Volvarina snyderi is a species of sea snail, a marine gastropod mollusk in the family Marginellidae, the margin snails.

== Description ==
The length of the shell attains 7.81 mm, its diameter is 3.44 mm.

== Distribution ==
This marine species occurs off Guadeloupe on the Caribbean Sea.
