= Volvarina latortuga =

Scientific classification
- Kingdom: Animalia
- Phylum: Mollusca
- Class: Gastropoda
- Subclass: Caenogastropoda
- Order: Neogastropoda
- Family: Marginellidae
- Subfamily: Marginellinae
- Genus: Volvarina
- Species: V. latortuga

Binomial name
- Volvarina latortuga Caballer, Espinosa & Ortea, 2009

Species of gastropod

Volvarina latortuga is a species of sea snail, a marine gastropod mollusk in the family Marginellidae, the margin snails.

== Description ==
The length of the shell attains 6.5 mm, its diameter 2.9 mm.

== Distribution ==
This marine species occurs off Venezuela.
