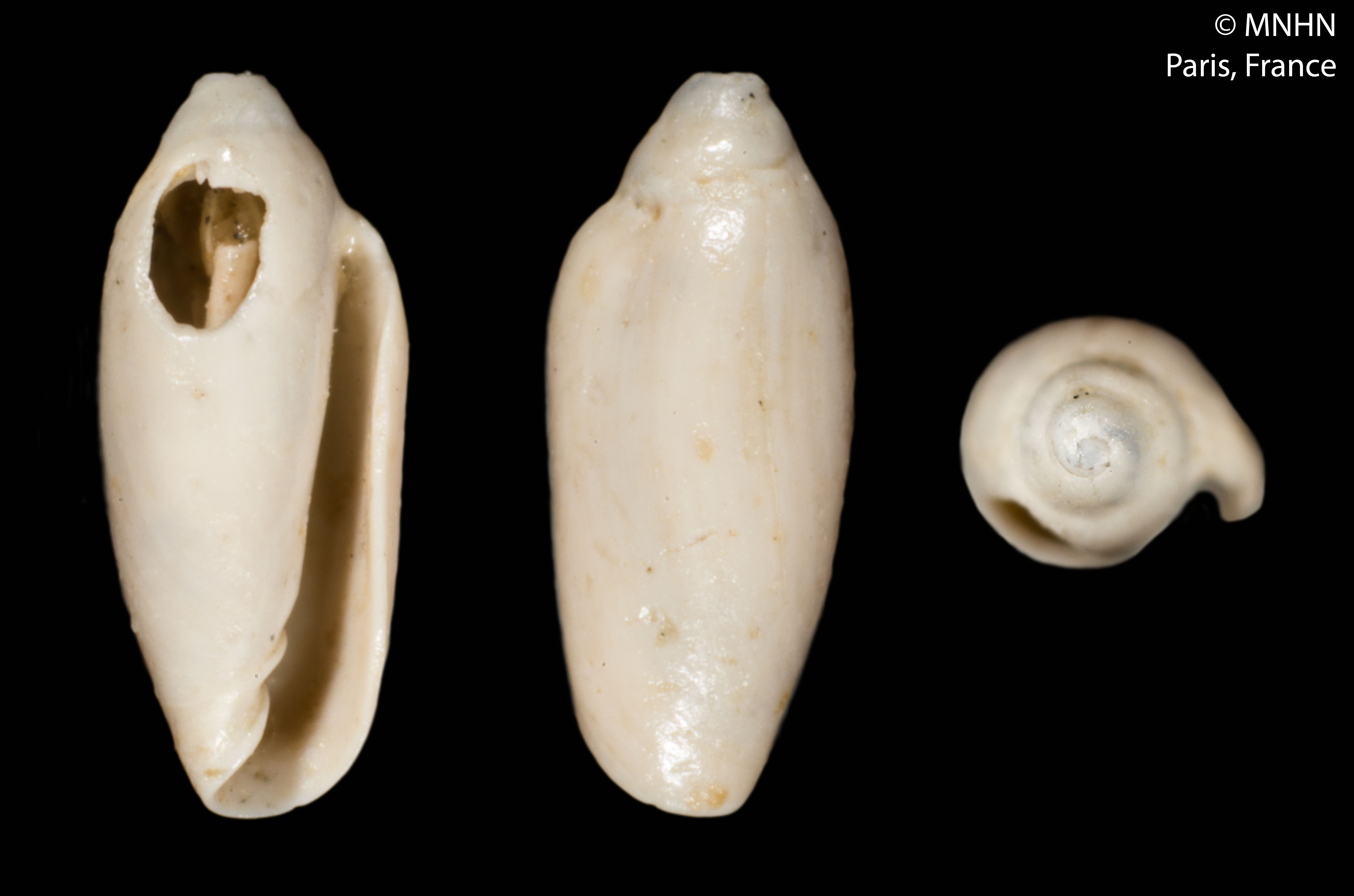
- Shell of Volvarina gouetensis (holotype at MNHN, Paris)

Scientific classification
- Kingdom: Animalia
- Phylum: Mollusca
- Class: Gastropoda
- Subclass: Caenogastropoda
- Order: Neogastropoda
- Family: Marginellidae
- Subfamily: Marginellinae
- Genus: Volvarina
- Species: †V. gouetensis

Binomial name
- †Volvarina gouetensis Le Renard & van Nieulande, 1985

= Volvarina gouetensis =

Species of gastropod

Volvarina gouetensis is an extinct species of sea snail, a marine gastropod mollusk in the family Marginellidae, the margin snails.

== Distribution ==
Fossils of this marine species were found in Middle Eocene strata in Loire-Atlantique, France.
