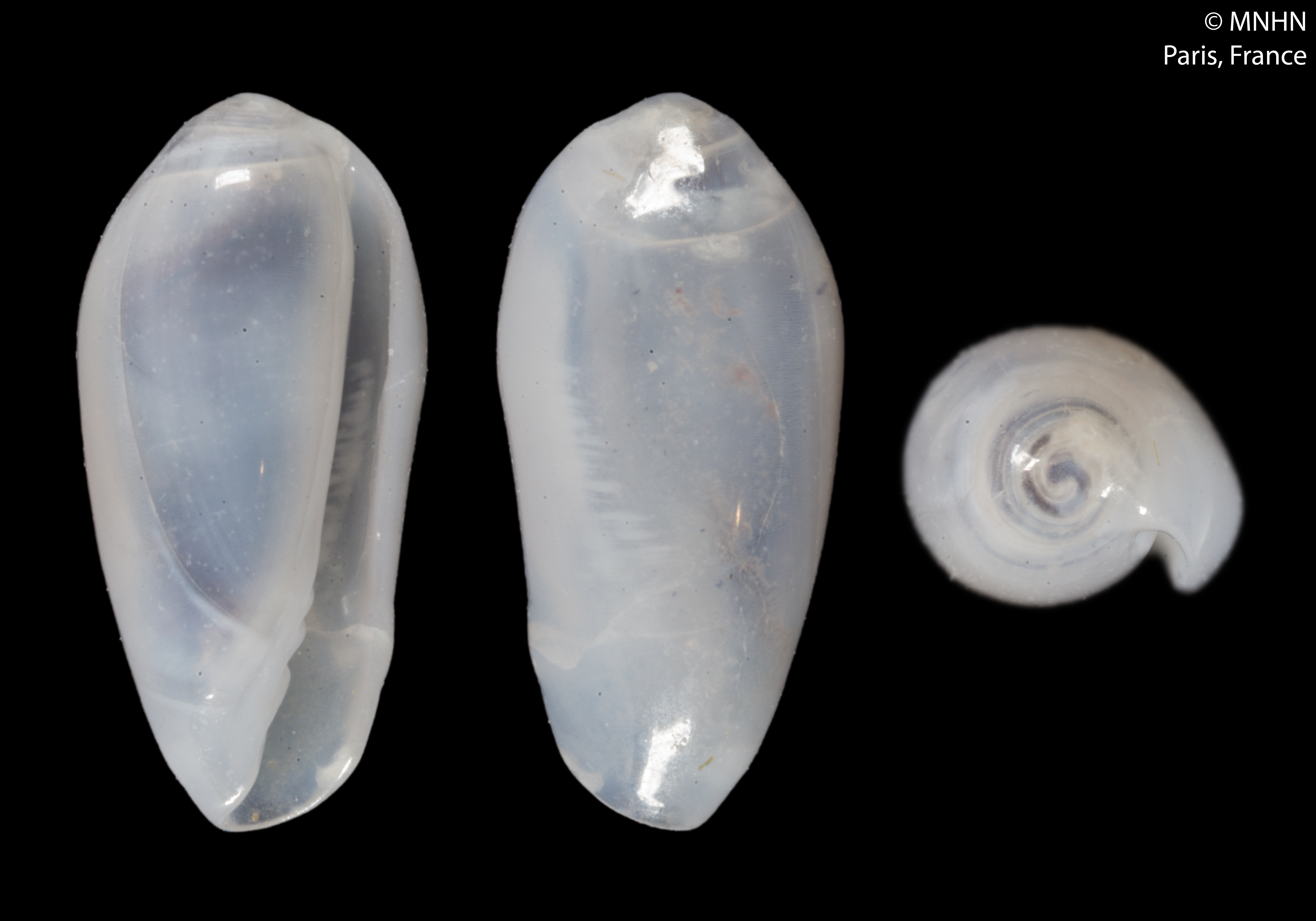
- Shell of Volvarina gargalloae (holotype in the MNHN, Paris)

Scientific classification
- Kingdom: Animalia
- Phylum: Mollusca
- Class: Gastropoda
- Subclass: Caenogastropoda
- Order: Neogastropoda
- Family: Marginellidae
- Subfamily: Marginellinae
- Genus: Volvarina
- Species: V. gargalloae

Binomial name
- Volvarina gargalloae Ortea, 2014

Synonyms
- Volvarina (Duplivolva) gargalloae Ortea, 2014 · alternate representation

= Volvarina gargalloae =

Species of gastropod

Volvarina gargalloae is a species of sea snail, a marine gastropod mollusk in the family Marginellidae, the margin snails.

== Description ==
The length of the shell attains 4.96 mm, its diameter is 2.2 mm.

== Distribution ==
This marine species occurs off Guadeloupe in the Caribbean Sea.
