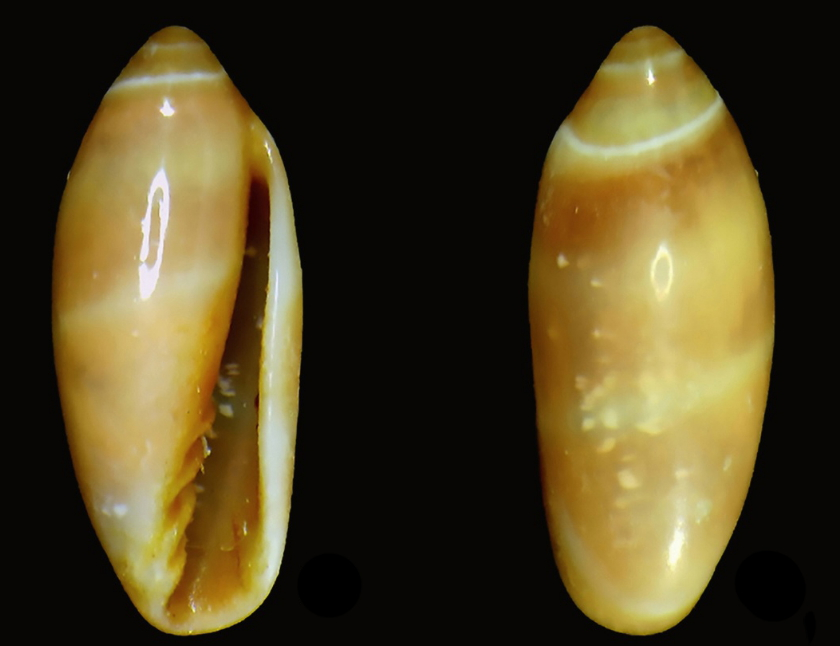
- Shell of Volvarina dekkeri (holotype at MNHN, Paris)

Scientific classification
- Kingdom: Animalia
- Phylum: Mollusca
- Class: Gastropoda
- Subclass: Caenogastropoda
- Order: Neogastropoda
- Family: Marginellidae
- Subfamily: Marginellinae
- Genus: Volvarina
- Species: V. dekkeri

Binomial name
- Volvarina dekkeri Boyer & Renda, 2021

= Volvarina dekkeri =

Species of gastropod

Volvarina dekkeri is a species of sea snail, a marine gastropod mollusk in the family Marginellidae, the margin snails.

== Description ==
The length of the shell attains 9.7 mm.

== Distribution ==
This marine species occurs off Muscat in the Gulf of Oman.
