= Volvarina monicae =

Scientific classification
- Kingdom: Animalia
- Phylum: Mollusca
- Class: Gastropoda
- Subclass: Caenogastropoda
- Order: Neogastropoda
- Family: Marginellidae
- Subfamily: Marginellinae
- Genus: Volvarina
- Species: V. monicae

Binomial name
- Volvarina monicae Díaz, Espinosa & Ortea, 1996

Species of gastropod

Volvarina monicae is a species of sea snail, a marine gastropod mollusk in the family Marginellidae, the margin snails.

== Description ==
The length of the shell attains 18.1 mm, its diameter 7.35 mm.

== Distribution ==
This marine species occurs off the Caribbean coast of Colombia.
