= Volvarina arrecifensis =

Scientific classification
- Kingdom: Animalia
- Phylum: Mollusca
- Class: Gastropoda
- Subclass: Caenogastropoda
- Order: Neogastropoda
- Family: Marginellidae
- Subfamily: Marginellinae
- Genus: Volvarina
- Species: V. arrecifensis

Binomial name
- Volvarina arrecifensis Espinosa, Ortea & Moro, 2013

Species of gastropod

Volvarina arrecifensis is a species of sea snail, a marine gastropod mollusk in the family Marginellidae, the margin snails.

== Description ==
The length of the shell attains 9.28 mm, its diameter 4.65 mm.

== Distribution ==
This marine species occurs off Lanzarote, Canary Islands, Atlantic Ocean.
