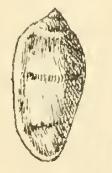
- Drawing of a shell of Volvarina corusca

Scientific classification
- Kingdom: Animalia
- Phylum: Mollusca
- Class: Gastropoda
- Subclass: Caenogastropoda
- Order: Neogastropoda
- Family: Marginellidae
- Subfamily: Marginellinae
- Genus: Volvarina
- Species: V. corusca

Binomial name
- Volvarina corusca (Reeve, 1865)

Synonyms
- Marginella corusca Reeve, 1865 ·; Marginella infans Reeve, 1865 · unaccepted; Volvarina infans (Reeve, 1865) ·

= Volvarina corusca =

Species of gastropod

Volvarina corusca, common name the glistening marginella, is a species of sea snail, a marine gastropod mollusk in the family Marginellidae, the margin snails.

== Description ==
The shell is ovate and slightly attenuated towards the base. It is transparent horny, livid and very faintly two-banded with red. The spire is obtuse. The outer lip is varicosely thickened. The columella is four-plaited.

== Distribution ==
This marine species occurs off Singapore.
