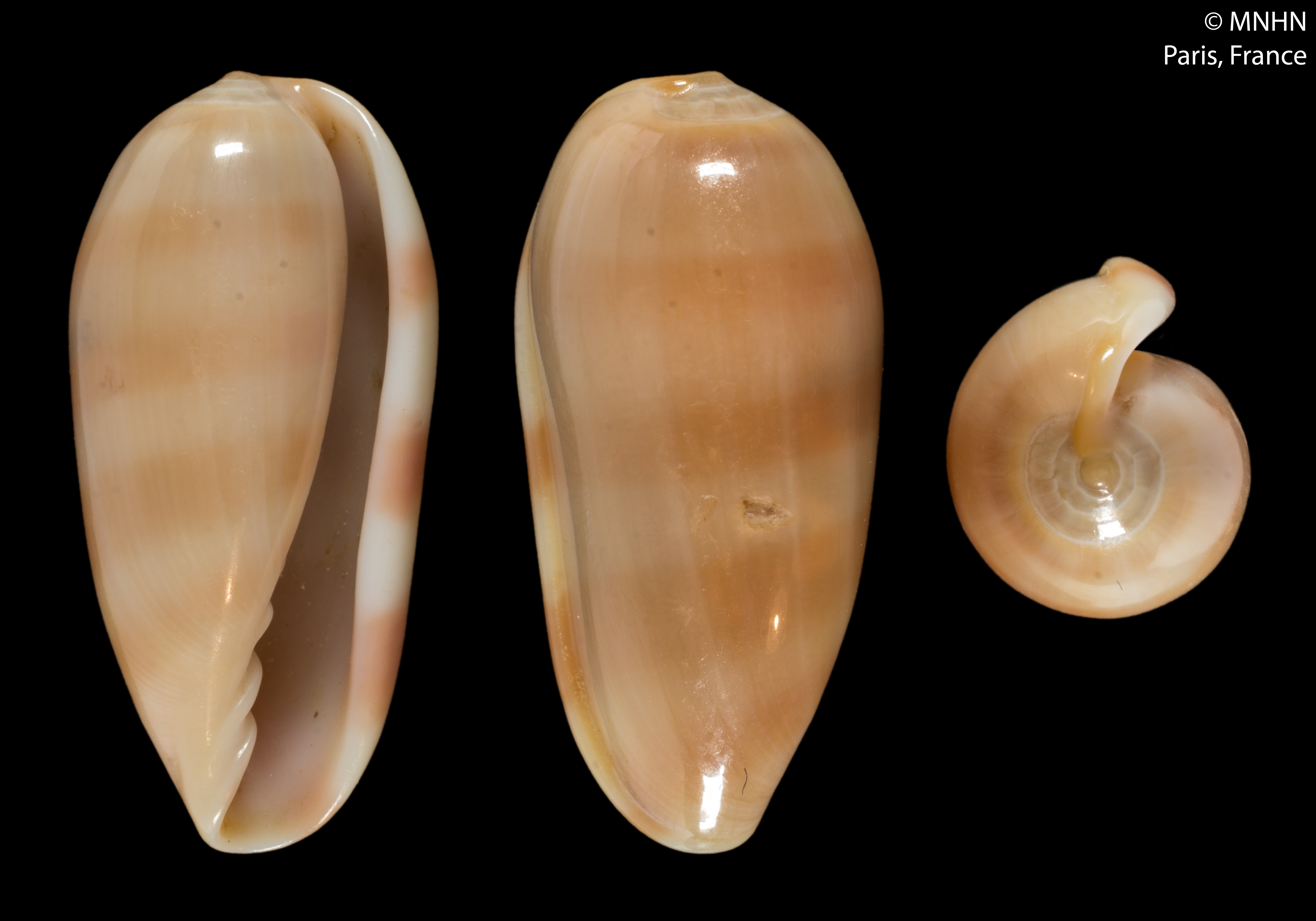
- Shell of Volvarina somalica (holotype at MNHN, Paris)

Scientific classification
- Kingdom: Animalia
- Phylum: Mollusca
- Class: Gastropoda
- Subclass: Caenogastropoda
- Order: Neogastropoda
- Family: Marginellidae
- Subfamily: Marginellinae
- Genus: Volvarina
- Species: V. somalica

Binomial name
- Volvarina somalica Boyer, 2015

= Volvarina somalica =

Species of gastropod

Volvarina somalica is a species of sea snail, a marine gastropod mollusk in the family Marginellidae, the margin snails.

The species was described in 2015 by F. Boyer in a study of Volvarina species from the western Indian Ocean; it was one of four new species introduced in that work.

== Description ==
The length of the shell attains 19.6 mm, its diameter 9.2 mm.

It is a benthic species, occurring at depths of 80 to 200 m.

== Distribution ==
This marine species occurs in the Indian Ocean off Somalia.
