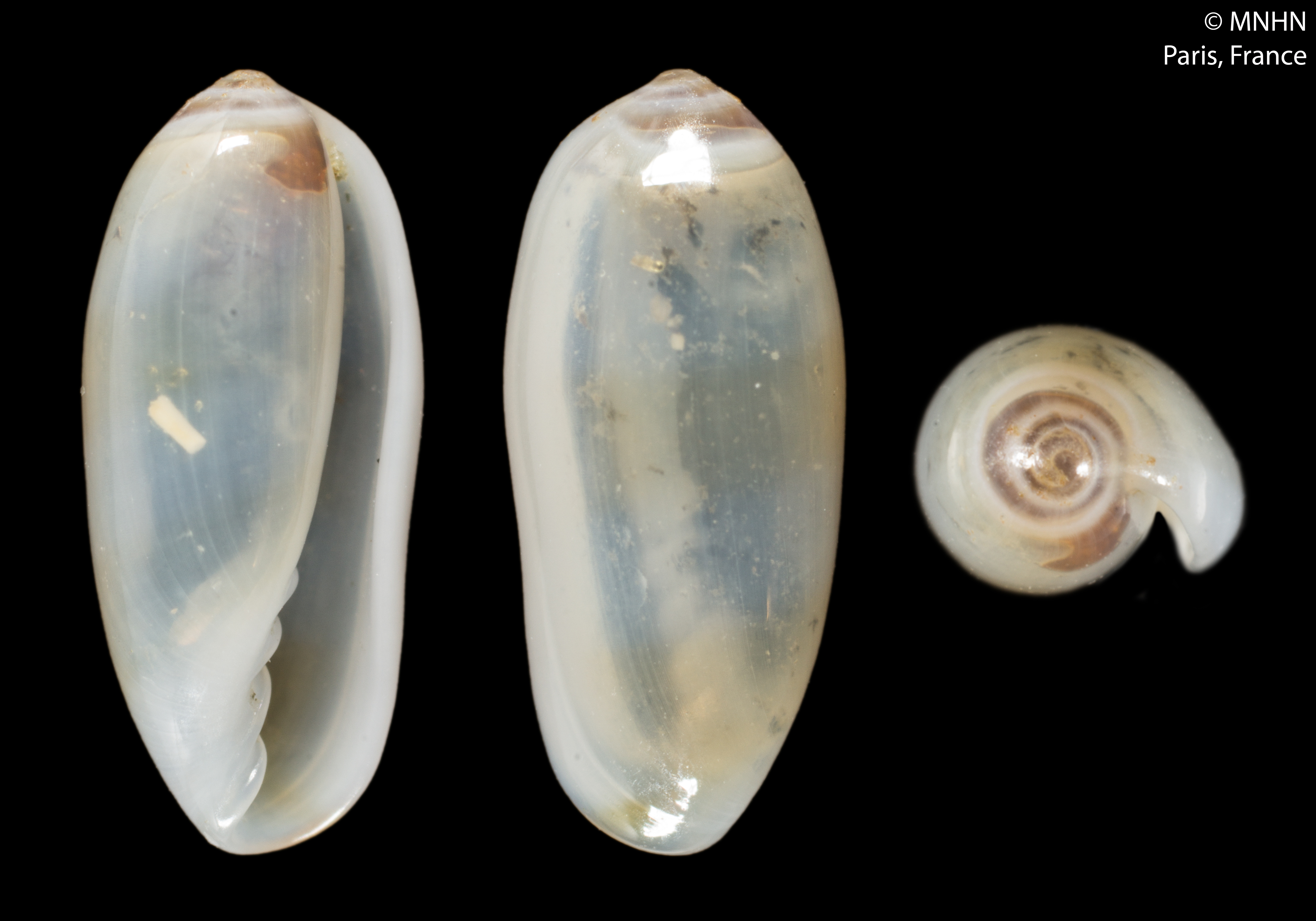
- Shell of Volvarina barbosae (holotype in the MNHN, Paris)

Scientific classification
- Kingdom: Animalia
- Phylum: Mollusca
- Class: Gastropoda
- Subclass: Caenogastropoda
- Order: Neogastropoda
- Family: Marginellidae
- Subfamily: Marginellinae
- Genus: Volvarina
- Species: V. barbosae

Binomial name
- Volvarina barbosae Ortea, 2014

Synonyms
- Volvarina (Remivolva) barbosae Ortea, 2014 ·

= Volvarina barbosae =

Species of gastropod

Volvarina barbosae is a species of sea snail, a marine gastropod mollusk in the family Marginellidae, the margin snails.

== Description ==
The length of the shell attains 6.93 mm, its diameter 2.88 mm.

== Distribution ==
This marine species occurs off Guadeloupe in the Caribbean Sea.
