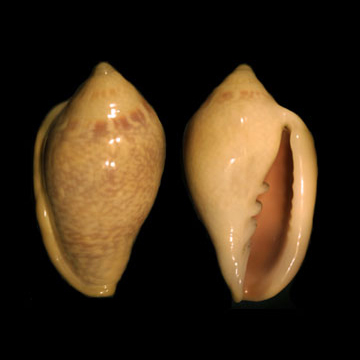
- Two views of a shell of Marginella glabella

Scientific classification
- Kingdom: Animalia
- Phylum: Mollusca
- Class: Gastropoda
- Subclass: Caenogastropoda
- Order: Neogastropoda
- Superfamily: Volutoidea
- Family: Marginellidae
- Subfamily: Marginellinae; Fleming, 1828

= Marginellinae =

Subfamily of sea snails

Marginellinae is a taxonomic subfamily within the larger family of Marginellidae, a group of small sea snails, marine gastropod molluscs in the superfamily Volutoidea.

== Genera ==
Abbreviations and conventions:

- † - (preceding the genus), denotes extinct genus
- † - (following species), denotes fossil species
- (M) - original designation by monotype
- OD - original designation
- OD (M) - original designation as type species, but also monotypic
- SD - subsequent designation as type
- SD (M) - subsequent designation as type species, but also monotypic
- T - original designation by tautonomy

In the systematic list, the following sequence is used for each generic synonym:

- Genus in original combination, followed by author, year, page number(s)
- Designation of type species followed by author, year, page number(s)
- Reference only to Type species

Marginellidae Fleming, 1828:328

Subfamily MARGINELLINAE Fleming, 1828:328

Genus † Myobarbum Sohl, 1963

Tribe AUSTROGINELLINI Coovert and Coovert, 1995:80

"Serrata Group"

Genus † Conuginella Laseron, 1957:288

Marginella inermis Tate, 1878 †; OD (M)

Genus Serrata Jousseaume, 1875:167

Serrata serrata (Gaskoin, 1849), = Marginella serrata Gaskoin, 1849;T

Genus Serrataginella Coovert and Coovert, 1995:82

Marginella spryi (Clover, 1974), OD (M)

Genus Stromboginella Laseron, 1957:289

Marginella crassidens Chapman and Crespin, 1928 †; OD (M)

Genus Hydroginella Laseron, 1957:284

Hydroginella dispersa Laseron, 1957; OD (M)

"Austroginella Group"

Genus † Mioginella Laseron, 1957:287

Marginella regula Cotton, 1949 †; OD (M)

Genus Protoginella Laseron, 1957:285

Marginella lavigata Brazier, 1877, = Marginella (Prunum) lavigata Brazier, 1877; OD (M)

Genus † Nudifaba Eames, 1952:122

Marginella (N.) rakhiensis Eames, 1952 †; OD (M)

Genus Alaginella Laseron, 1957:286

Marginella ochracea Angas, 1871; OD

Genus † Hiwia Marwick, 1931:129

Marginella (Hiwia) amplificata Marwick, 1931 †; OD (M)

Genus Austroginella Laseron, 1957:285

Marginella muscaria Lamarck, 1822; OD

Genus Mesoginella Laseron, 1957:282

Marginella turbinata G. B. Sowerby II, 1846; OD (M)

Genus Closia Gray, 1857:36

Closia sarda (Kiener, 1834), = Marginella sarda Kiener, 1834; M

Genus Ovaginella Laseron, 1957

Marginella ovulum G. B. Sowerby II, 1846; OD

Genus Balanetta Jousseaume, 1875

Balanetta baylei Jousseaume, 1875; M

Tribe PRUNINI Coovert and Coovert, 1995:80

Genus Volvarina Hinds, 1844:75

Marginella nitida Hinds, 1844, = Marginella (Volvarina) nitida Hinds, 1844, = Voluta mitrella Risso, 1826; SD Redfield, 1870:221

Genus Prunum Herrmannsen, 1852:113

Voluta prunum Gmelin, 1791; M

Genus Bullata Jousseaume, 1875:167, 250

Bullata bullata (Born, 1778), = Voluta bullata Born, 1778; T

Genus Rivomarginella Brandt, 1968:275

Rivomarginella morrisoni Brandt 1968; OD (M)

Genus Cryptospira Hinds, 1844:76

Marginella tricincta Hinds, 1844, = Marginella (Cryptospira) tricincta Hinds, 1844; SD (M) Gray, 1847:142

Genus Hyalina Schumacher, 1817:234

Hyalina pellucida Schumacher, 1817, = Bulla pallida Linné, 1758; M

Tribe MARGINELLINI Fleming, 1828:328

Genus † Stazzania Sacco, 1890a:138

Marginella (Stazzania) emarginata Sismonda, 1847, = Marginella emarginata Sismonda, 1847 †; M

Genus Dentimargo Cossmann, 1899:90

Marginella dentifera Lamarck, 1803 †; OD

Genus Eratoidea Weinkauff, 1879:140

Marginella margarita Kiener, 1834; SD Cossmann, 1899:87

Genus † Euryentome Cossmann, 1899:95: the fossil genus Euryentome is proposed as a junior synonym of Serrata Jousseaume, 1875

Marginella crassilabra Conrad, 1833 (non Marginella crassilabar Bory de St. Vincent, 1827), = Marginella silabra Palmer, 1937 (nom. nov.), = Marginella aratina Lea, 1833 †; OD

Genus Gibbacousteau Espinosa & Ortea, 2013
Genus † Simplicoglabella Sacco, 1890b:21

Marginella (Glabella) taurinensis Michelotti, 1847 †; SD (M)

Genus Marginella Lamarck, 1799:70

Voluta glabella Linné, 1758; M

Genus Glabella Swainson, 1840:133

Voluta faba Linné, 1758; SD (M) Gray, 1847:142
