= List of marine molluscs of Brazil =

The list of marine molluscs of Brazil is a partial list of saltwater species that form a part of the molluscan fauna of Brazil. This list does not include the land or freshwater molluscs. Bounded by the Atlantic Ocean on the east, Brazil has a coastline of 7,491 kilometers (4,655 mi), where most species listed herein can be found.

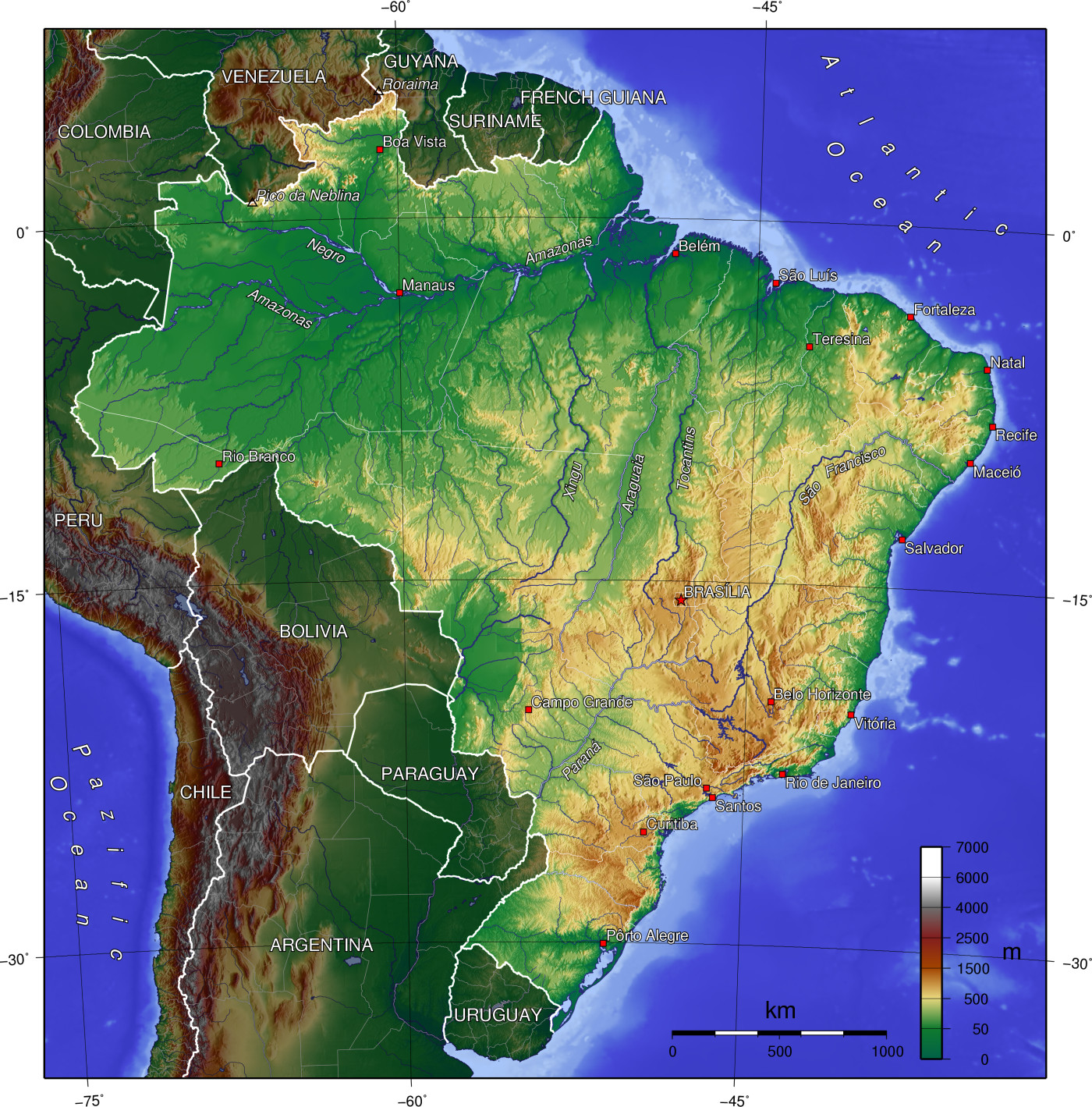
Brazil has a coastline of 7,491 kilometers (4,655 mi)

== Gastropoda ==
List of marine gastropods:

=== Heterobranchia ===
Family Acteonidae

- Acteon mirim C. Cunha, 2011
- Acteon pelecais Ev. Marcus, 1972
- Crenilabium birmani Simone, 2006
- Mysouffa cumingii (A.Adams, 1854)

Family Amathinidae

- Iselica globosa (H. C. Lea, 1843)

Family Aplysiidae

- Aplysia brasiliana Rang, 1828
- Aplysia dactylomela (Rang, 1828)
- Aplysia fasciata Poiret, 1789
- Aplysia juliana (Quoy & Gaimard, 1832)

Family Architectonicidae

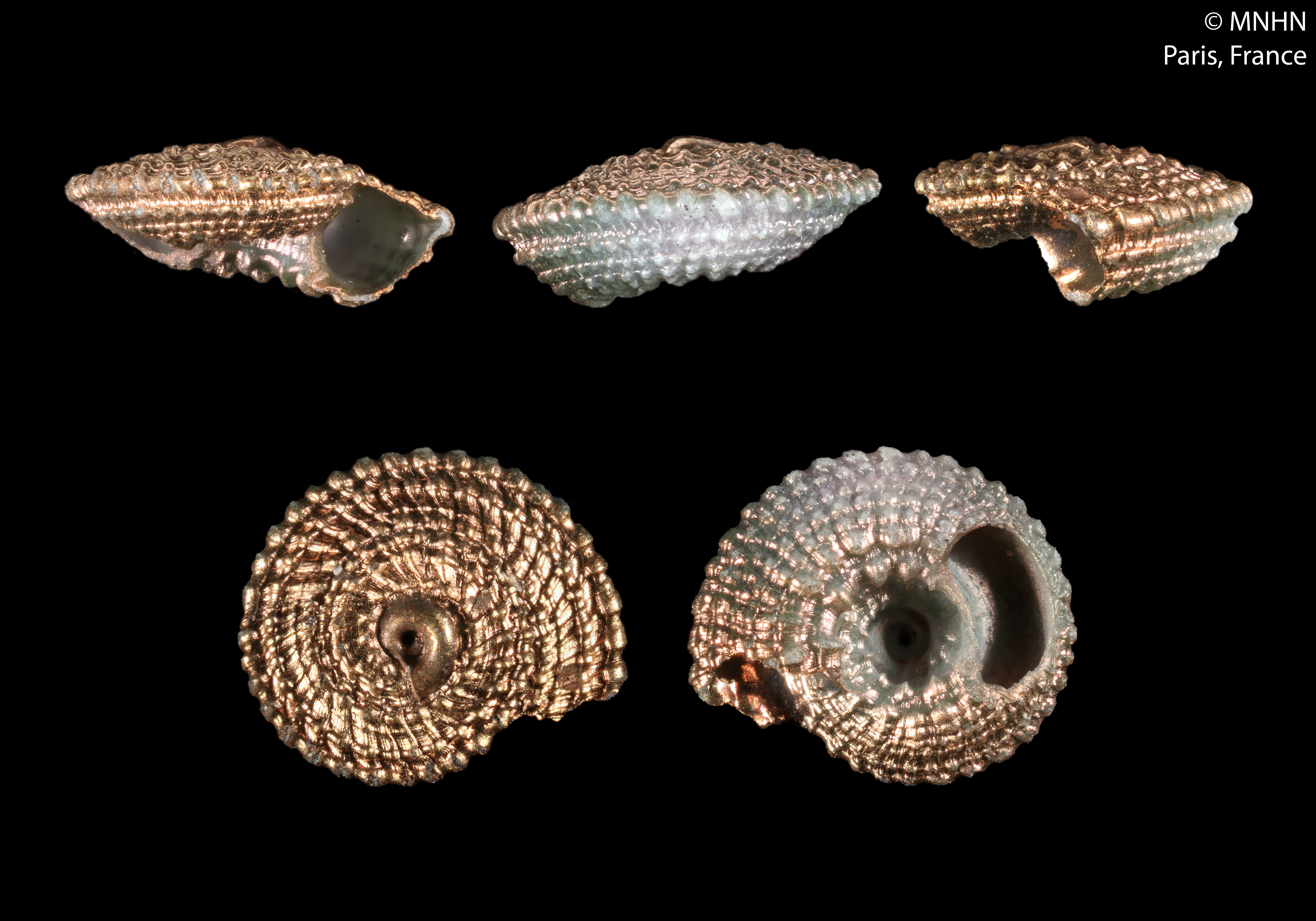
Shell of Pseudotorinia phorcysi (holotype at MNHN, Paris)

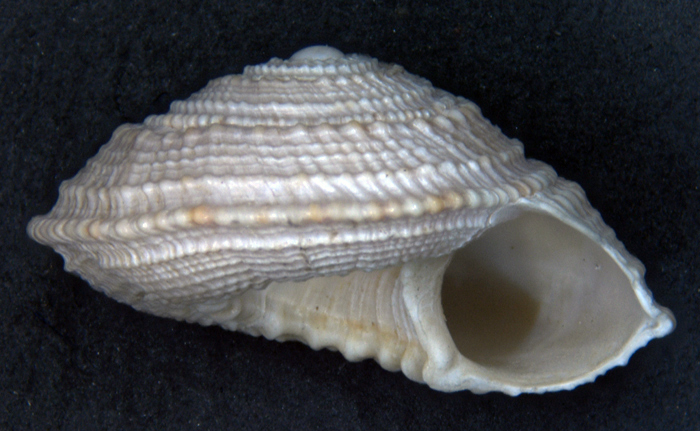
Apertural view of a shell of Solatisonax cabrali

- Architectonica nobilis Röding, 1798
- Heliacus cylindricus (Gmelin, 1791)
- Heliacus bisulcatus (Orbigny, 1845)
- Pseudotorinia architae (Costa, 1841)
- Pseudotorinia phorcysi Cavallari, Salvador & Simone, 2014
- Psilaxis clertoni Tenório, Barros, Francisco & Silva, 2011
- Psilaxis krebsii (Mörch, 1875)
- Solatisonax cabrali Tenório, Barros, Francisco & Silva, 2011
- Solatisonax rudigerbieleri Tenório, Barros, Francisco & Silva, 2011
- Spirolaxis centrifuga (Monterosato, 1890)
- Spirolaxis lamellifer (Rehder, 1935)

=== Littorinimorpha ===
Family Barleeidae

- Caelatura pernambucensis (Watson, 1885)

Family Calyptraeidae

- Bostrycapulus odites Collin, 2005
- Calyptraea centralis (Conrad, 1841)
- Crepidula carioca Simone, 2006
- Crepidula intratesta Simone, 2006
- Crepidula protea d'Orbigny, 1841
- Crepidula pyguaia Simone, 2006

Family Littorinidae

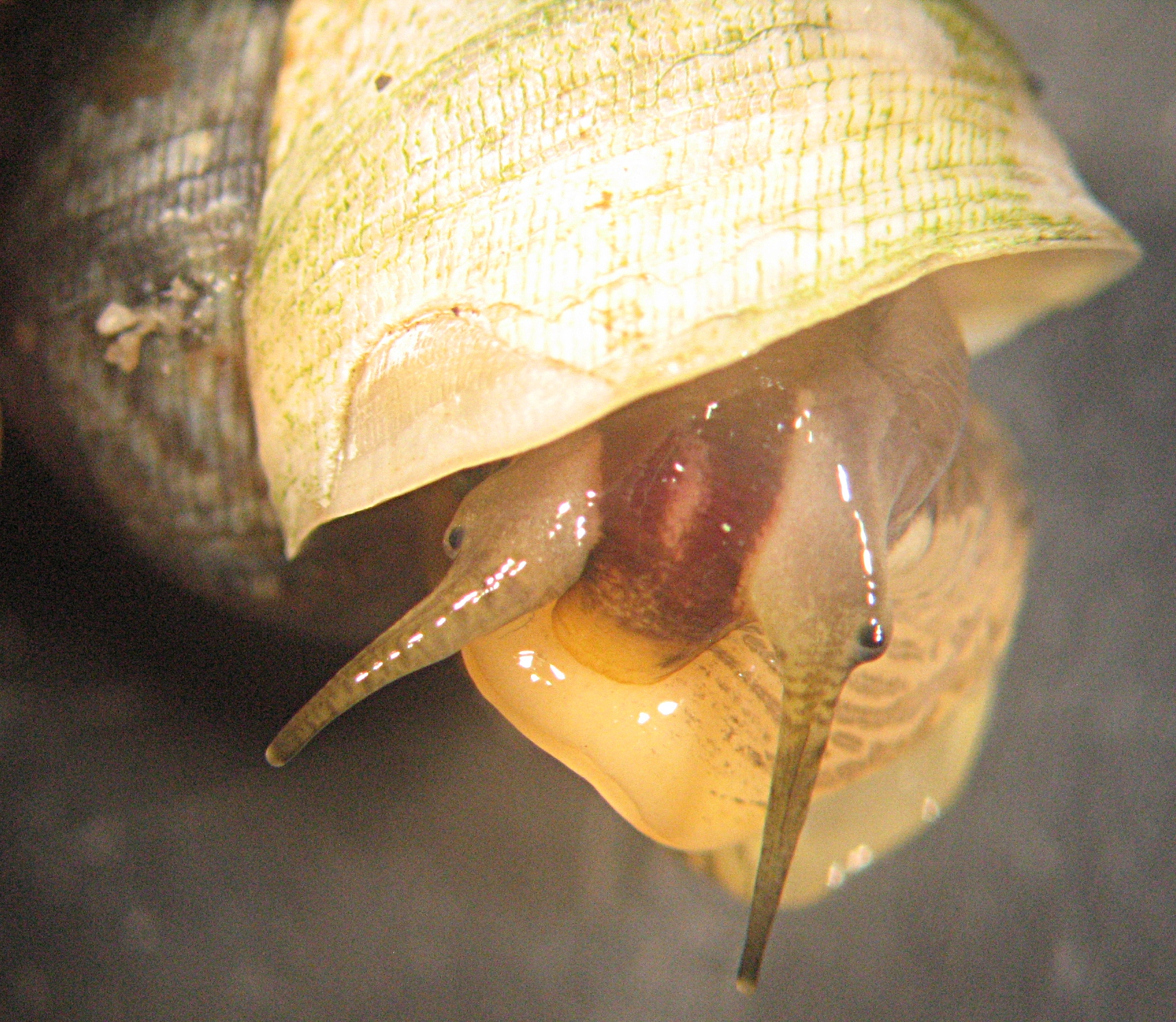
A live specimen of Littoraria flava

- Echinolittorina lineolata (d'Orbigny, 1840)
- Littoraria angulifera (Lamarck, 1822)
- Littoraria flava (King & Broderip, 1832)

Family Personidae

- Distorsio clathrata (Lamarck, 1816)
- Distorsio perdistorta Fulton, 1938

Family Strombidae

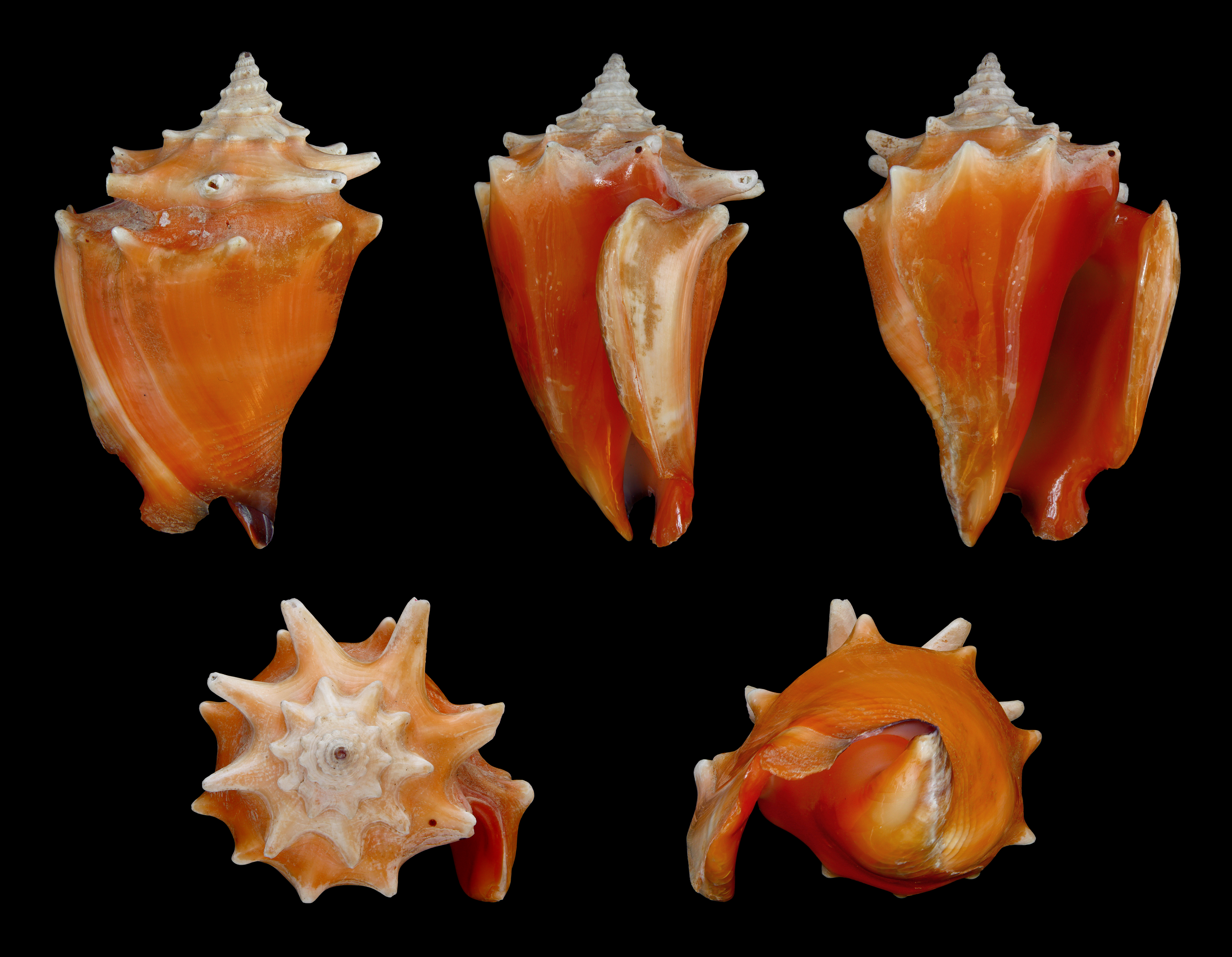
Five views of a shell of Strombus pugilis

- Aliger gallus (Linnaeus, 1758)
- Macrostrombus costatus (Gmelin, 1791)
- Strombus pugilis (Linnaeus, 1758)
- Titanostrombus goliath (Schröter, 1805) - endemic to Brazil
- Tricornis raninus (Gmelin, 1791)

=== Neogastropoda ===
Family Ancillariidae

Five views of a shell of Eburna lienardii

- Amalda josecarlosi Pastorino, 2003
- Ancilla faustoi H. R. Matthews, H. C. Matthews & Muniz Dijck, 1979
- Ancilla matthewsi J. Q. Burch & R. L. Burch, 1967
- Eburna lienardii (Bernardi, 1859)

Family Bursidae

- Bursa corrugata (G. Perry, 1811)
- Bursa natalensis Coelho & Matthews, 1970
- Bursa grayana Dunker, 1862
- Bursa granularis (Röding, 1798)
- Bursa ranelloides Reeve, 1844
- Marsupina bufo (Bruguière, 1792)

Family Cancellariidae

- Microcancilla brasiliensis (Verhecken, 1991)
- Microcancilla phoenix Souza, Pimenta & Miyaji, 2021

Family Cassidae

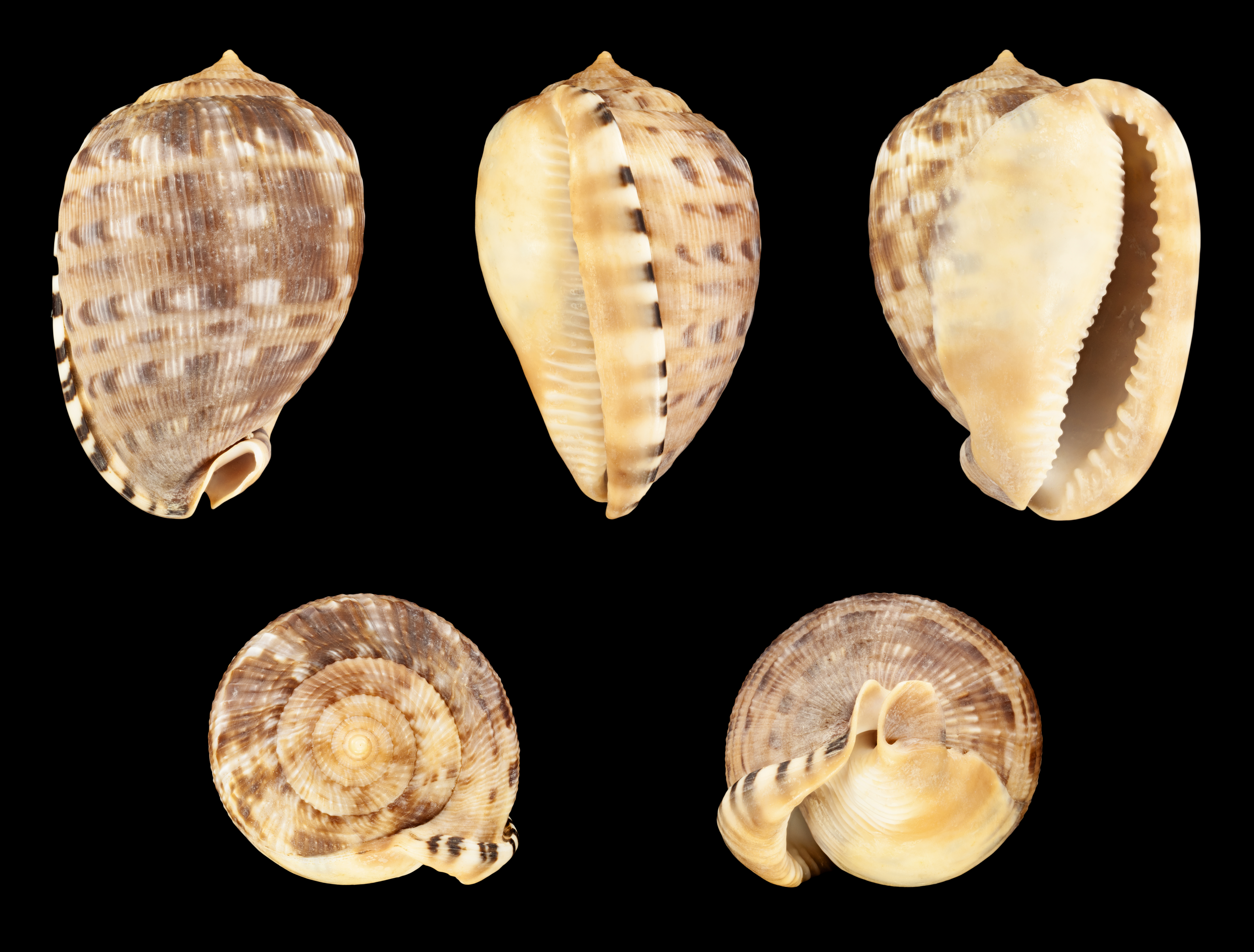
Five views of a shell of Cypraecassis testiculus

- Casmaria atlantica Clench, 1944
- Cassis tuberosa (Linnaeus, 1758)
- Cypraecassis testiculus (Linnaeus, 1758)
- Semicassis granulata (Born, 1778)
- Semicassis labiata (Carcelles, 1953)

Family Marginellidae

- Bullata analuciae de Souza & Coovert, 2001
- Bullata bullata (Born, 1778)
- Bullata guerrinii de Souza & Coovert, 2001
- Bullata largillieri (Kiener, 1834)
- Bullata lilacina (Sowerby II, 1846)
- Bullata matthewsi (van Mol & Tursch, 1967)
- Eratoidea scalaris (Jousseaume, 1875)
- Leptegouana tripartita (Cossignani, 2006)
- Prunum fulminatum (Kiener, 1841)
- Prunum rubens (Martens, 1881)
- Volvarina brasiliana Boyer, 2000

Family Melongenidae

- Pugilina tupiniquim Abbate & Simone, 2015

Family Muricidae

- Chicoreus brevifrons (Lamarck, 1822)
- Chicoreus spectrum (Reeve, 1846)
- Coronium coronatum (Penna-Neme & Leme, 1978)
- Coronium elegans Simone, 1996
- Coronium oblongum Simone, 1996
- Dermomurex oxum Petuch, 1979
- Leptotrophon atlanticus Pimenta, Couto & Costa, 2008
- Phyllonotus oculatus Reeve, 1845
- Pterynotus havanensis Vokes, 1970
- Stramonita brasiliensis Claremont & D. G. Reid, 2011
- Stramonita rustica (Lamarck, 1822)
- Siratus senegalensis (Gmelin, 1791)

Family Pisaniidae

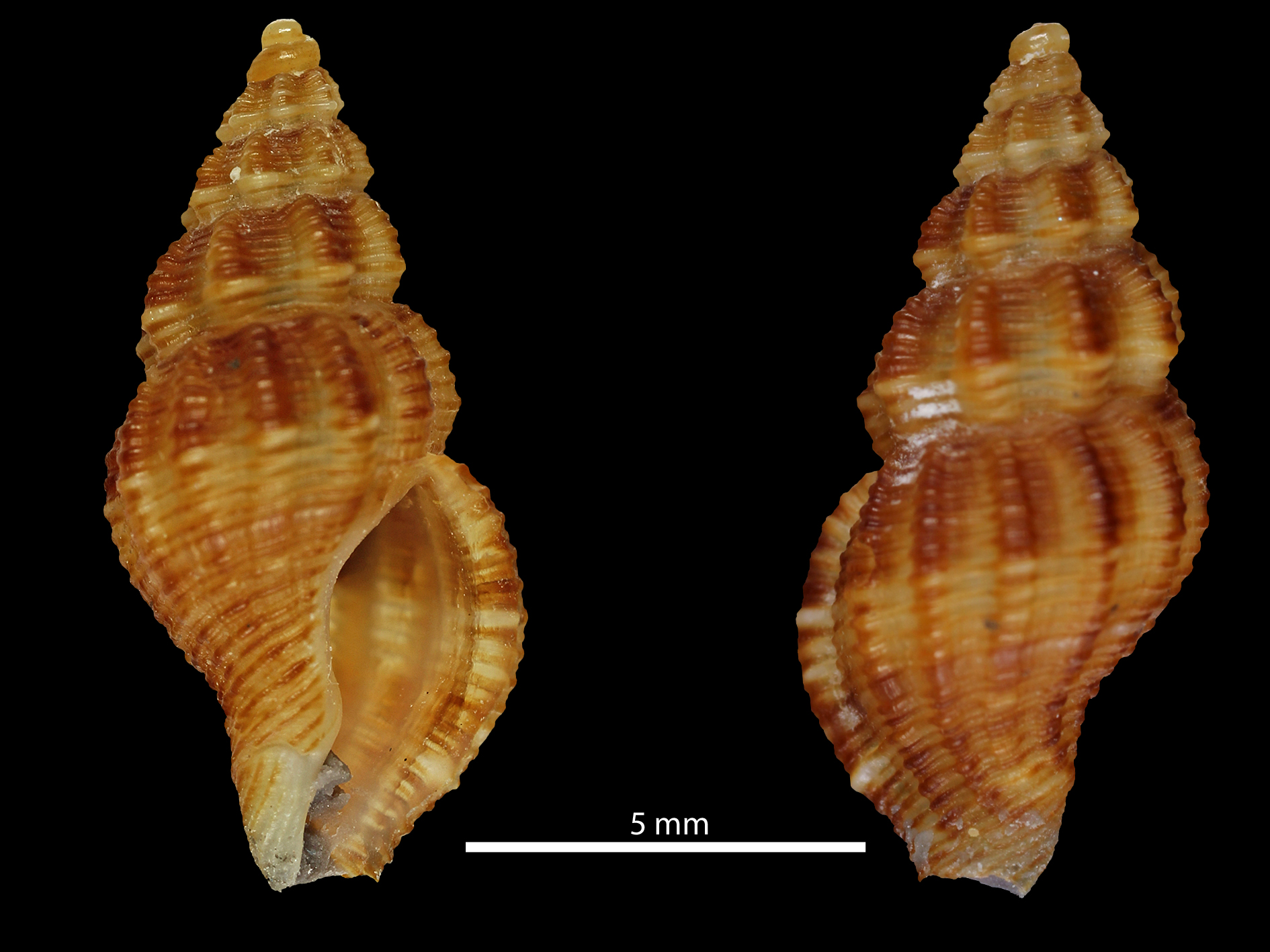
Shell of Anna capixaba (paratype at MNHN, Paris)

- Anna capixaba Coltro & Dornellas, 2013
- Engina goncalvesi Coltro, 2005
- Engina janowskyi Coltro, 2005
- Gemophos auritulus (Link, 1807)
- Hesperisternia karinae (Usticke, 1953)
- Monostiolum atlanticum (Coelho, Matthews & Cardoso, 1970)
- Pisania pusio (Linnaeus, 1758)

Family Tonnidae

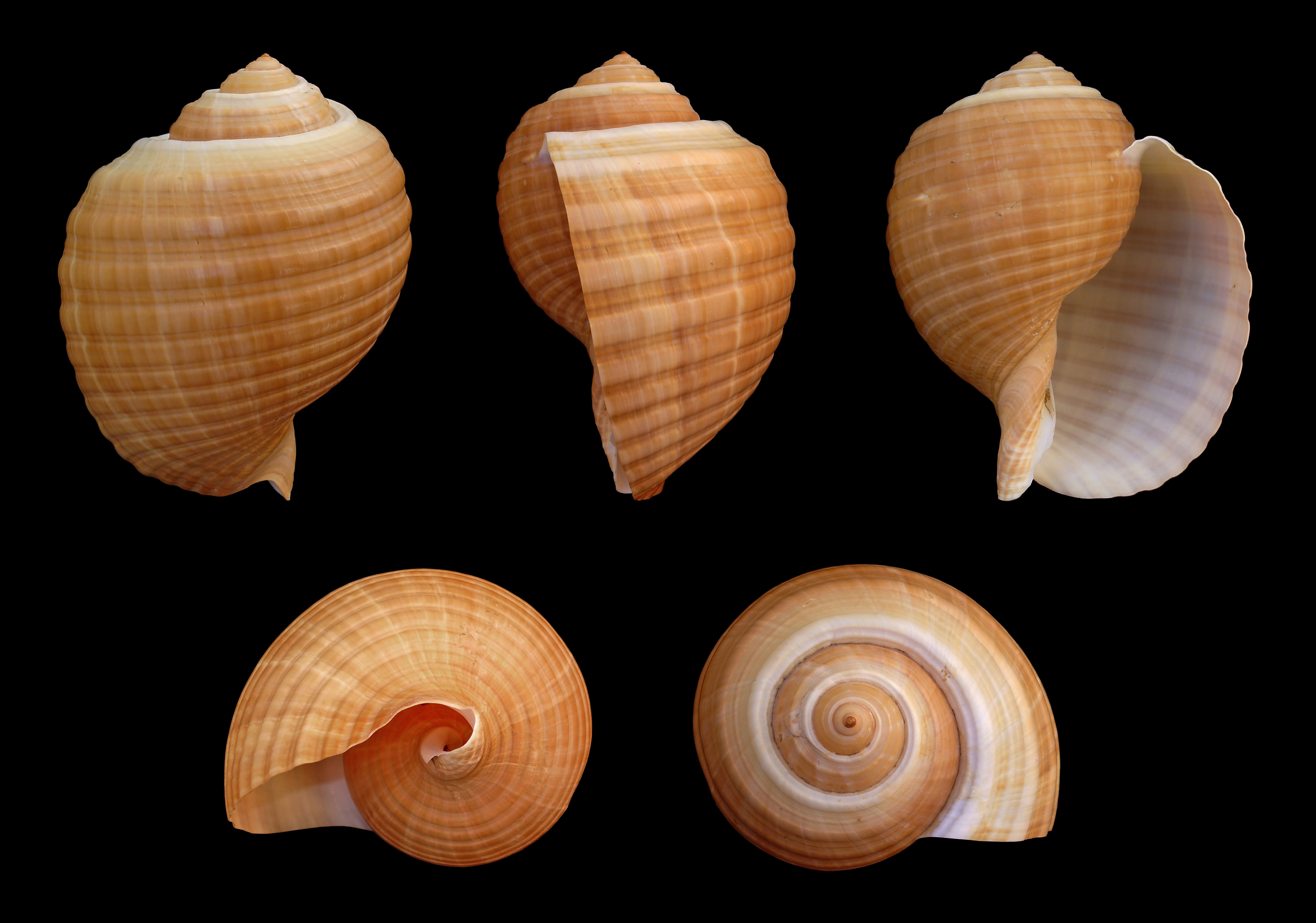
Five views of a shell of Tonna galea

- Malea noronhensis Kempf & Matthews, 1969
- Tonna galea (Linnaeus, 1758)
- Tonna pennata (Morch, 1853)

Family Turbinellidae

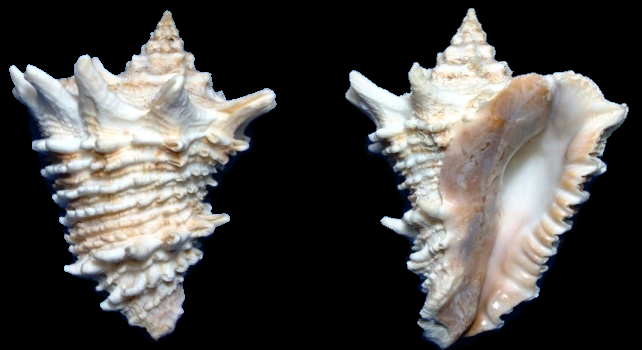
Two views of a shell of the helmet vase Vasum cassiforme

- Vasum cassiforme (Kiener, 1841)
- Turbinella laevigata Anton, 1839
- Fulgurofusus sarissophorus (Watson, 1882)
- Fulgurofusus ecphoroides Harasewych, 1983
- Fugurofusus coronatus (Penna-Neme & Leme, 1978)

=== Unassigned Caenogastropoda ===
Family Abyssochrysidae

- Abyssochrysos brasilianus Bouchet, 1991

Family Cerithiidae

- Bayericerithium bayeri Petuch, 2001
- Cerithium atratum (Born, 1778)
- Ittibittium oryza (Mörch, 1876)

Family Litiopidae

- Alaba incerta (d'Orbigny, 1841)
- Litiopa melanostoma Rang, 1829

Family Modulidae

- Modulus modulus (Linnaeus, 1758)

Family Nystiellidae

- Opaliopsis atlantis (Clench & Turner, 1952)
- Opaliopsis cearense Andrade, Costa & Pimenta, 2011
- Opaliopsis opalina (Dall, 1927)

Family Planaxidae

- Angiola lineata (Costa, 1778)
- Fossarus orbignyi Fischer, 1864

Family Triphoridae

- Metaxia excelsa Faber & Moolenbeek, 1991
- Metaxia taeniolata (Dall, 1889)
- Metaxia rugulosa (C.B. Adams, 1850)
- Metaxia prompta Rolán & Fernández-Garcés, 2008
- Metaxia gongyloskymnus Fernandes & Pimenta, 2011

=== Vetigastropoda ===
Family Areneidae

- Arene bairdii (Dall, 1889)
- Arene boucheti Leal, 1991
- Arene brasiliana (Dall, 1927)
- Arene flexispina Leal & Coelho, 1985
- Arene lychee Cavallari & Simone, 2018
- Arene microforis (Dall, 1889)
- Arene riisei Rehder, 1943
- Arene variabilis (Dall, 1889)
- Arene venusta (Woodring, 1929)

Family Calliostomatidae

- Calliostoma axelolssoni Quinn, 1992
- Calliostoma brunneopictum Quinn, 1992
- Calliostoma bullisi Clench & Turner, 1960
- Calliostoma caribbechinatum Landau, Van Dingenen & Ceulemans, 2017
- Calliostoma carcellesi Clench & Aguayo, 1940
- Calliostoma coppingeri (Smith, 1880)
- Calliostoma depictum Dall, 1927
- Calliostoma gemmosum (Reeve, 1842)
- Calliostoma hassler Clench & Aguayo, 1939
- Calliostoma javanicum (Lamarck, 1822)
- Calliostoma jucundum (Gould, 1849)
- Calliostoma melliferum Cavallari & Simone, 2018 - endemic to Brazil
- Calliostoma militare Ihering, 1907
- Calliostoma moscatellii Quinn, 1992
- Calliostoma nordenskjoldi Strebel, 1908
- Calliostoma rude Quinn, 1992
- Calliostoma tupinamba Dornellas, 2012 - endemic to Brazil
- Calliostoma valkuri Cavallari, Salvador, Dornellas & Simone, 2019
- Calliostoma viscardii Quinn, 1992
- Calliostoma rota Quinn, 1992
- Calliostoma tenebrosum Quinn, 1992
- Falsimargarita terespira Simone, 2008

Family Chilodontidae

- Mirachelus clinocnemus Quinn, 1979

Family Colloniidae

- Homalopoma boffii Marini, 1975 - endemic to Brazil
- Homalopoma linnei (Dall, 1889)

Family Fissurellidae

- Diodora cayenensis (Lamarck, 1822)

Family Haliotidae

- Haliotis aurantium Simone, 1998

Family Margaritidae

- Callogaza watsoni Dall, 1881
- Gaza compta Simone & Cunha, 2006
- Margarites imperialis Simone & Birman, 2006

Family Phasianellidae

- Eulithidium affine (C.B. Adams, 1850)

Family Seguenziidae

- Ancistrobasis costulata (Watson, 1879)
- Carenzia carinata (Jeffreys, 1877)
- Carenzia trispinosa (Watson, 1879)
- Hadroconus altus (Watson, 1879)
- Halystina umberlee Salvador, Cavallari & Simone, 2014
- Seguenzia elegans Jeffreys, 1885
- Seguenzia formosa Jeffreys, 1876
- Seguenzia triteia Salvador, Cavallari & Simone, 2014

Family Solariellidae

- Bathymophila euspira (Dall, 1881)
- Lamellitrochus cancapae (Vilvens & Swinnen, 2007)
- Lamellitrochus carinatus Quinn, 1991
- Lamellitrochus pourtalesi (Clench & Aguayo, 1939)
- Solariella carvalhoi Lopes & Cardoso, 1958
- Solariella quinni Barros & Pereira in Barros et al., 2008
- Suavotrochus lubricus (Dall, 1881)

Family Tegulidae

- Agathistoma nordestinum Dornellas, Gabroski, Hellberg & Lotufo, 2022 - endemic to Brazil
- Agathistoma hotessierianum (d'Orbigny, 1842)
- Agathistoma patagonicum (d'Orbigny, 1835)
- Agathistoma viridulum (Gmelin, 1791)

Family Trochidae

- Halistylus columna (Dall, 1890)

== Bivalvia ==
Species of bivalves include:

Family Anomiidae

- Pododesmus rudis

Family Arcidae

- Anadara brasiliana
- Anadara chemnitzii
- Bathyarca pectunculoides
- Lunarca ovalis

Family Donacidae

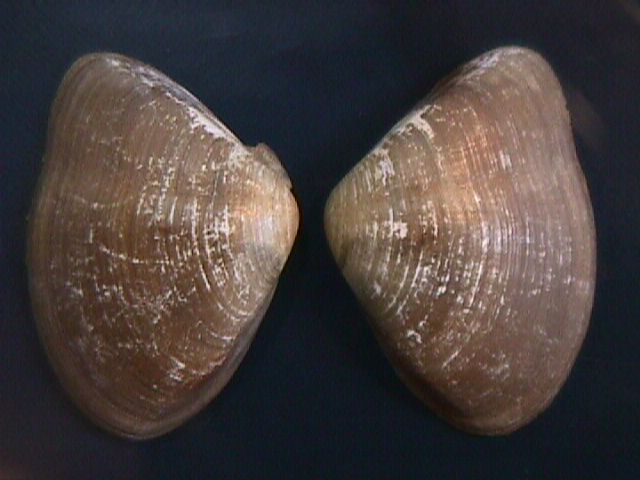
Iphigenia brasiliensis

- Donax gemmula
- Donax hanleyanus
- Iphigenia brasiliana

Family Glycymerididae

- Glycymeris longior
- Glycymeris pectinata

Family Limopsidae

- Limopsis aurita
- Limopsis minuta
- Limopsis davinae

Family Ostreidae

- Ostrea puelchana

Family Pectinidae

- Aequipecten tehuelchus
- Euvola ziczac
- Leptopecten bavayi

Family Philobryidae

- Cosa brasiliensis

Family Propeamussiidae

- Parvamussium pourtalesianum
- Cyclopecten nanus
- Cyclopecten hoskynsi (Forbes, 1844)

Family Semelidae

- Abra brasiliana
- Semele casali
- Semele nuculoides
- Semele proficua
- Semele purpurascens

Family Tellinidae

- Tellina iheringi
- Tellina listeri
- Tellina martinicensis
- Tellina punicea
- Tellina lineata
- Tellina trinitatis
- Tellina nitens
- Tellina versicolor
- Tellina exerythra
- Tellina gibber
- Tellina diantha
- Tellina sandix
- Macoma constricta
- Macoma cleryana
- Macoma uruguayensis

Family Veneridae

- Amiantis purpuratus
- Anomalocardia brasiliana
- Callista maculata
- Chione cancellata
- Chione paphia
- Chione pubera
- Chione subrostrata
- Cyclinella tenuis
- Dosinia concentrica
- Gouldia cerina
- Pitar fulminatus
- Pitar rostratus
- Protothaca pectorina
- Tivela mactroides (Born, 1778)
- Transenpitar americana
- Ventricolaria rigida

== Polyplacophora ==
Species of polyplacophorans include:

Family Acanthochitonidae

- Acanthochitona ciroi
- Acanthochitona pygmaea
- Acanthochitona rhodeus

Family Chaetopleuridae

- Chaetopleura angulata
- Chaetopleura apiculata
- Chaetopleura asperrima
- Chaetopleura isabellei (d'Orbigny, 1841)
- Chaetopleura sowerbiana
- Chaetopleura janeirensis
- Connexochiton moreirai

Family Ischnochitonidae

- Ischnochiton aidae
- Ischnochiton dorsuosus
- Ischnochiton edwini
- Ischnochiton erythronotus
- Ischnochiton hartmeyeri
- Ischnochiton lopesi
- Ischnochiton marcusi
- Ischnochiton pectinatus
- Ischnochiton striolatus
- Stenoplax boogii (Haddon, 1886)
- Stenoplax kempfi
- Stenoplax purpurascens

Family Tonicellidae

- Lepidochitona rosea Kaas, 1972

== See also ==
- List of non-marine molluscs of Brazil

Lists of molluscs of surrounding countries:

- List of marine molluscs of French Guiana
- List of marine molluscs of Uruguay
