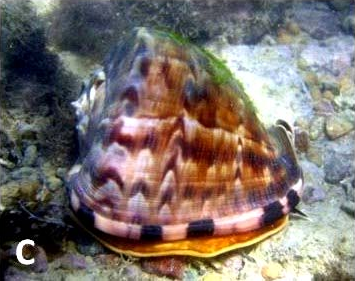
- A live C. tuberosa in situ

Conservation status
- Apparently Secure (NatureServe)

Scientific classification
- Kingdom: Animalia
- Phylum: Mollusca
- Class: Gastropoda
- Subclass: Caenogastropoda
- Order: Littorinimorpha
- Family: Cassidae
- Genus: Cassis
- Species: C. tuberosa

Binomial name
- Cassis tuberosa (Linnaeus, 1758)

Synonyms
- Buccinum tuberosum Linnaeus, 1758; Buccinum striatum Gmelin, 1791; Cassis (Cassis) tuberosa (Linnaeus, 1758); Cassis triangularis Coulon, 1936; Cassis triquetra Rigacci, 1866

= Cassis tuberosa =

Species of gastropod

Cassis tuberosa, the king helmet, is a species of very large sea snail with a solid, heavy shell, a marine gastropod mollusc in the family Cassidae, the helmet shells and their allies.

== Distribution ==
This species occurs in the Western Atlantic Ocean in: North Carolina, Florida, Mexico, Honduras, Colombia, Costa Rica, Panama, Venezuela, Bermuda, Bahamas, Turks & Caicos, Cuba, Hispaniola, Puerto Rico, Virgin Islands, Leeward Islands, Windward Islands, Brazil, and in the Eastern Atlantic Ocean at the Cape Verde Islands.

King Helmet (Cassis tuberosa) crawling in the shallows on Bonaire (Caribbean Netherlands).

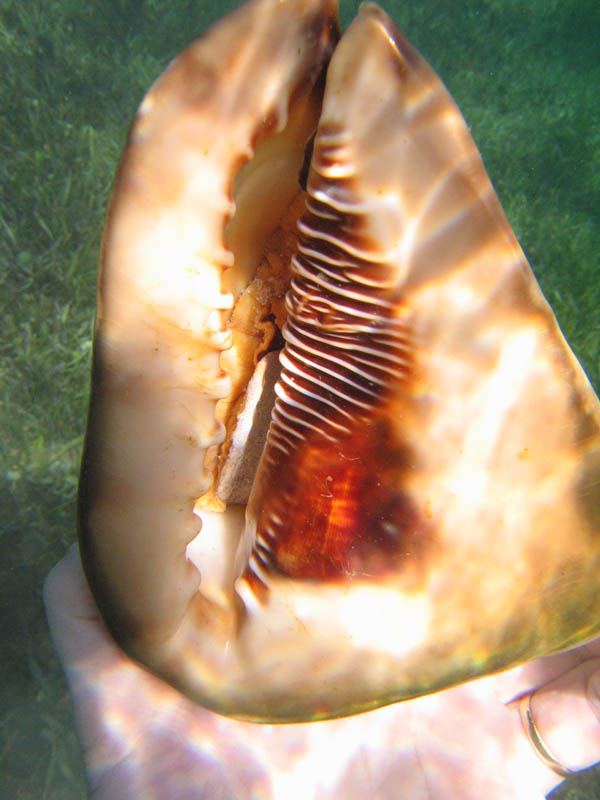
Ventral side, animal alive but soft parts retracted

== Description ==
The maximum recorded shell length is 301 mm. The shell of Cassis tuberosa is typically cream colored with dark brown spots. The dorsal surface will have fine growth lines and fine spiral lines to create a "canceled effect".

== Habitat ==
The minimum recorded depth for this species is 0 m. and maximum recorded depth is 27 m. The species resides in shallow coastal waters around sandy beaches, as well as reef environments. It lives in tandem with seagrass beds, macroalgae banks, rhodolith beds and coral rubble.

== Human use ==
The shell of this species has been used for creating cameos.

The attractiveness of the shell is one of the main reasons C. tuberosa is taken for human use. Due to their preference for shallow waters, they are easily accessed by tourists.
