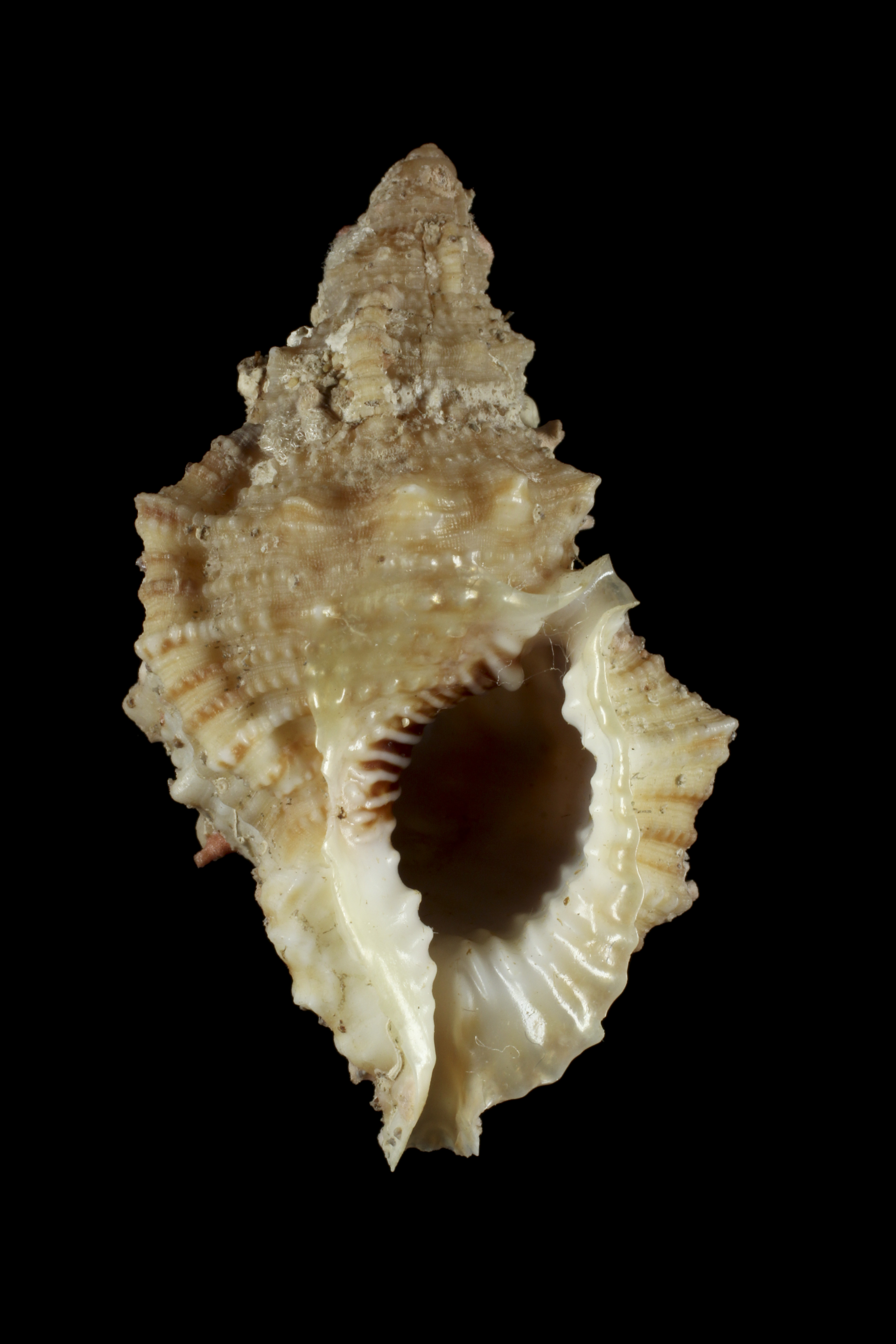
- Shell of Tritonoranella latitudo (specimen at MNHN, Paris)

Scientific classification
- Kingdom: Animalia
- Phylum: Mollusca
- Class: Gastropoda
- Subclass: Caenogastropoda
- Order: Littorinimorpha
- Superfamily: Tonnoidea
- Family: Bursidae
- Genus: Tritonoranella
- Species: T. latitudo

Binomial name
- Tritonoranella latitudo Garrard, 1961

Synonyms
- Bursa (Bufonariella) latitudo Garrard, 1961; Bursa (Bufonariella) latitudo wolfei Beu, 1981; Bursa (Colubrellina) latitudo Garrard, 1961 ·; Bursa (Colubrellina) latitudo latitudo (Garrard, T.A., 1961); Bursa latitudo Garrard, 1961

= Tritonoranella latitudo =

Species of gastropod

Tritonoranella latitudo is a species of sea snail, a marine gastropod mollusk in the family Bursidae, the frog shells. Species within the Bursidae family are often characterized by their globose, heavily sculptured shells, which provide defense against predators and are key diagnostic features for taxonomic classification.

== Description ==
The length of the shell varies between 75 mm and 95 mm.

=== Classification ===
- Domain: Eukaryota
- Kingdom: Animalia
- Phylum: Mollusca
- Class: Gastropoda
- Genus: Tritonoranella
- Species: Tritonoranella latitudo

== Distribution ==
This marine species occurs in the Indo-West Pacific, in the East China Sea and off South Queensland, Australia and the Philippines
