= Coronium acanthodes =

Scientific classification
- Kingdom: Animalia
- Phylum: Mollusca
- Class: Gastropoda
- Subclass: Caenogastropoda
- Order: Neogastropoda
- Family: Muricidae
- Genus: Coronium
- Species: C. acanthodes

Binomial name
- Coronium acanthodes (Watson, 1882)

Synonyms
- Trophon acanthodes Watson, 1882

Species of gastropod

Coronium acanthodes is a species of sea snail, a marine gastropod mollusc in the family Muricidae, the murex snails or rock snails.
