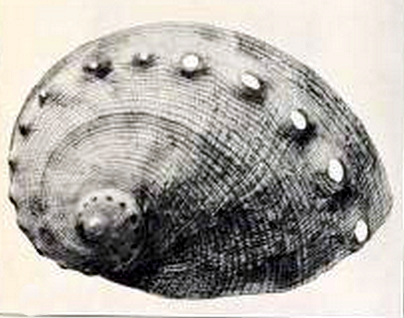
- Original image of Haliotis dalli

Conservation status
- Data Deficient (IUCN 3.1)

Scientific classification
- Kingdom: Animalia
- Phylum: Mollusca
- Class: Gastropoda
- Subclass: Vetigastropoda
- Order: Lepetellida
- Family: Haliotidae
- Genus: Haliotis
- Species: H. dalli

Binomial name
- Haliotis dalli Henderson J.B., 1915

Synonyms
- Haliotis (Padollus) dalli Henderson J.B., 1915

= Haliotis dalli =

Species of gastropod

Haliotis dalli, common name the Galápagos abalone, is a species of sea snail, a marine gastropod mollusk in the family Haliotidae, the abalones.

It has been confused in the past with Haliotis pourtalesii Dall, 1881, that occurs off Florida. This was due to the destruction of the holotype of Haliotis pourtalesii in the Great Chicago Fire of 1871.

Subspecies

- Haliotis dalli dalli Henderson, 1915
- Haliotis dalli roberti McLean, 1970 (synonym: Haliotis roberti McLean, 1970)

== Description ==
The description given by W.H. Dall in 1889 of Haliotis pourtalesii matches exactly the description used in 1915 by J.B. Henderson in describing Haliotis dalli, with W.H. Dall agreeing.

"The small shell has a pale brick-red color, with white dots on some of the spirals. The shell is rather elevated, with about two and a half whorls. The apex is small and prominent. It contains about 25 holes of which five remain open. The margins of these are rather prominent. Outside the row of holes the usual sulcus is strongly marked. About midway from the suture to the lines of holes is a raised rib, rather obscure, but differing in different individuals and corresponding to an internal sulcus. Between the central ridges and the suture there are no undulations or transverse ridges of consequence. The sculpture consists of well marked, rather flattish, spiral, close-set threads, sometimes with a single finer intercalary thread, overlaid by smaller rather compressed transverse ridges, in harmony with the incremental lines. On top of the spirals the ridges bulge like the threads of worsted on canvas embroidery. The spire is situated well forward and with subvertical sides. The interior surface is pearly. The coil of the spire is rather close and the margin of the columella is flattened."

This species differs from most other Haliotis species by having a very narrow lateral tooth in the radula and having concentric rings on the cephalic tentacles. It shares these characteristics only with Haliotis roberti (which has become the subspecies Haliotis dalli roberti, (McLean, 1970)) and Haliotis pourtalesii and the subspecies Haliotis pourtalesii aurantium (Simone, 1998)

== Distribution ==
This species occurs in the Pacific Ocean off the Galapagos Islands and Western Colombia.
