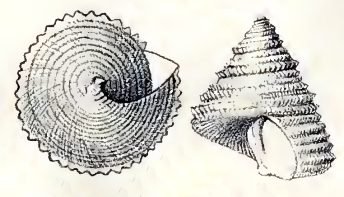
- Drawing with two views of Calliostoma echinatum

Scientific classification
- Kingdom: Animalia
- Phylum: Mollusca
- Class: Gastropoda
- Subclass: Vetigastropoda
- Order: Trochida
- Family: Calliostomatidae
- Genus: Calliostoma
- Species: C. echinatum

Binomial name
- Calliostoma echinatum Dall, 1881

= Calliostoma echinatum =

Species of gastropod

Calliostoma echinatum is a species of sea snail, a marine gastropod mollusk in the family Calliostomatidae.

== Description ==
(Original description by W.H. Dall) The size of the shell varies between 5 mm and 10 mm. The small, white shell has an acute-conical shape, in general resembling Calliostoma sapidum, but less stout and solid and with a wholly different sculpture. The six whorls are somewhat appressed toward the apex. The nucleus is smooth, semi-transparent, inflated, and shining, and the remainder of the shell is opaque white with the following sculpture. On the upper whorls, four revolving ribs with smaller inconspicuous ones between them, crossed by faint plications (more evident on the smaller whorls). These produce nodosities which, on the four principal ribs, and especially on the third one, counting from the suture toward the base, rise to acutely pointed projections separated by an incurved scallop of about twice the width of the projections. Toward the aperture, the ribs and nodosities become more equal in size. The base of the shell is flattened, impervious, and sculptured with some fifteen close set flattened revolving ribs crossed by impressed radiating lines of growth. The aperture is nearly rectangular. The columella is straight, stout, and not projecting, without a callus. The margin is thin, and a little crenulated by the sculpture.

== Distribution ==
This species occurs in the Gulf of Mexico and the Caribbean Sea off Cuba; in the Atlantic Ocean off Brazil at depths between 37 mm and 220 m.
