= Coronium petalos =

Scientific classification
- Kingdom: Animalia
- Phylum: Mollusca
- Class: Gastropoda
- Subclass: Caenogastropoda
- Order: Neogastropoda
- Superfamily: Muricoidea
- Family: Muricidae
- Subfamily: Trophoninae
- Genus: Coronium
- Species: C. petalos

Binomial name
- Coronium petalos Houart & Sellanes, 2010

Species of gastropod

Coronium petalos is a species of sea snail in the family Muricidae, the murex snails or rock snails.
