= Calliostoma caribbechinatum =

Scientific classification
- Kingdom: Animalia
- Phylum: Mollusca
- Class: Gastropoda
- Subclass: Vetigastropoda
- Order: Trochida
- Superfamily: Trochoidea
- Family: Calliostomatidae
- Subfamily: Calliostomatinae
- Genus: Calliostoma
- Species: C. caribbechinatum

Binomial name
- Calliostoma caribbechinatum Landau, Van Dingenen & Ceulemans, 2017

Synonyms
- Calliostoma echinatum Dall, 1881

Species of gastropod

Calliostoma caribbechinatum is a species of sea snail, a marine gastropod mollusk, in the family Calliostomatidae within the superfamily Trochoidea, the top snails, turban snails and their allies.
