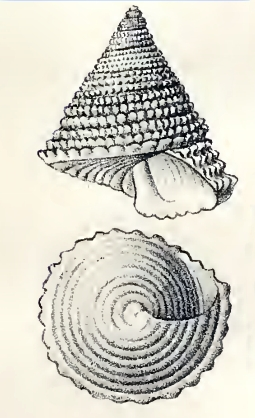
- Drawing with two views of a shell of Calliostoma sapidum

Scientific classification
- Kingdom: Animalia
- Phylum: Mollusca
- Class: Gastropoda
- Subclass: Vetigastropoda
- Order: Trochida
- Family: Calliostomatidae
- Genus: Calliostoma
- Species: C. sapidum

Binomial name
- Calliostoma sapidum Dall, 1881

= Calliostoma sapidum =

Species of gastropod

Calliostoma sapidum is a species of sea snail, a marine gastropod mollusk in the family Calliostomatidae.

== Description ==
The height of the shell attains 6 mm. It is entirely white, not colored. It has seven whorls. The sutures are slightly channelled, and therefore distinctly visible. There are four beaded ribs on the upper side of the body whorl, and the beads are coarse. The interspaces are wide enough to show the lines of growth crossing them. The nodules on the peripheral rib in this whorl are undulations rather than beads, and sufficiently large to give a crenulated appearance to the border of the shell when viewed from below. There are eight revolving ribs on the base crossed by fine ridges following the lines of growth. There is no umbilicus or callus. The columella is not grooved or thickened. The aperture is oblique and proportionately less wide than in Calliostoma apicinum to which the whole shell bears a strong superficial resemblance.

== Distribution ==
This species occurs in the Caribbean Sea, the Gulf of Mexico and off the Lesser Antilles; in the Atlantic Ocean off Eastern Brazil.
