= Haliotis pourtalesii aurantium =

Scientific classification
- Kingdom: Animalia
- Phylum: Mollusca
- Class: Gastropoda
- Subclass: Vetigastropoda
- Order: Lepetellida
- Family: Haliotidae
- Genus: Haliotis
- Species: H. pourtalesii
- Subspecies: H. p. aurantium

Trinomial name
- Haliotis pourtalesii aurantium Simone, 1998

Synonyms
- Haliotis aurantium Simone, 1998 (original combination)

Subspecies of gastropod

Haliotis pourtalesii aurantium is a subspecies of edible sea snail, a marine gastropod mollusk in the family Haliotidae, the abalone. This is a Western Atlantic species.

== Distribution ==
This species occurs off Brazil.

== Description ==
The maximum recorded shell length is 15 mm.

The size of the shell varies between 9 mm and 20 mm.

== Habitat ==
Minimum recorded depth is 48 m. Maximum recorded depth is 150 m.
