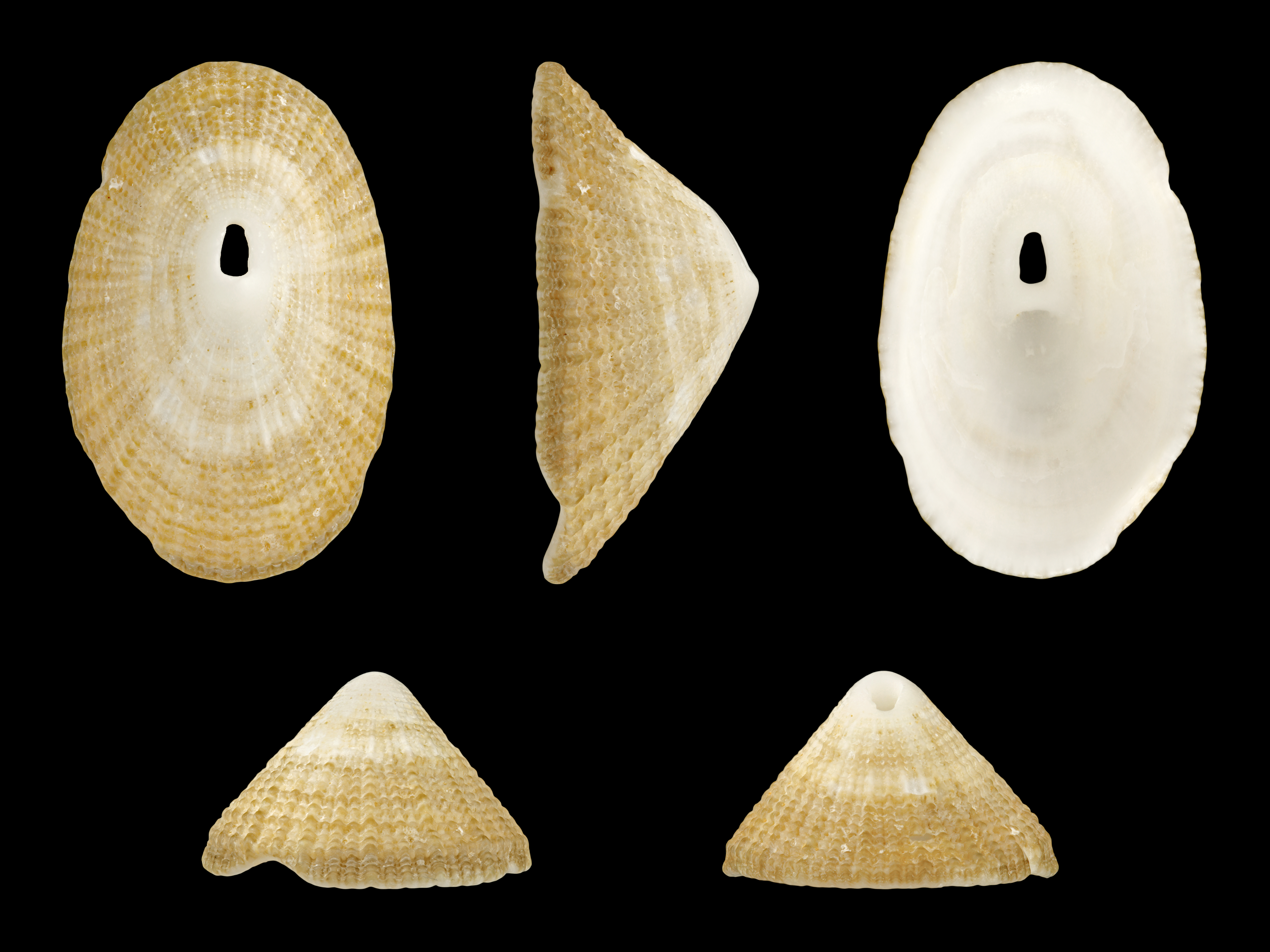

Scientific classification
- Kingdom: Animalia
- Phylum: Mollusca
- Class: Gastropoda
- Subclass: Vetigastropoda
- Order: Lepetellida
- Family: Fissurellidae
- Genus: Diodora
- Species: D. cayenensis

Binomial name
- Diodora cayenensis (Lamarck, 1822)

Synonyms
- Diodora microsticta Dall, 1927; Fissurella alternata Say, 1822; Fissurella cayenensis Lamarck, 1822 (original combination); Fissurella fumata Reeve, 1850; Fissurella larva Reeve, 1850; Fissurella viminea Reeve, 1850; Glyphis alternata (Say, 1822); Lucapina cayenensis (Lamarck, 1822)

= Diodora cayenensis =

Species of gastropod

Diodora cayenensis, the Cayenne keyhole limpet, is a species of small to medium-sized sea snail or limpet, a western Atlantic marine prosobranch gastropod mollusk in the family Fissurellidae, the keyhole limpets.

This species is named after Cayenne, the capital of French Guiana. The spelling using one "n" is original and is therefore retained.

== Distribution ==
The Cayenne keyhole limpet is found from New Jersey south through the West Indies to Brazil; in the Gulf of Mexico and in the Caribbean Sea; off the Canary Islands.

== Shell description ==
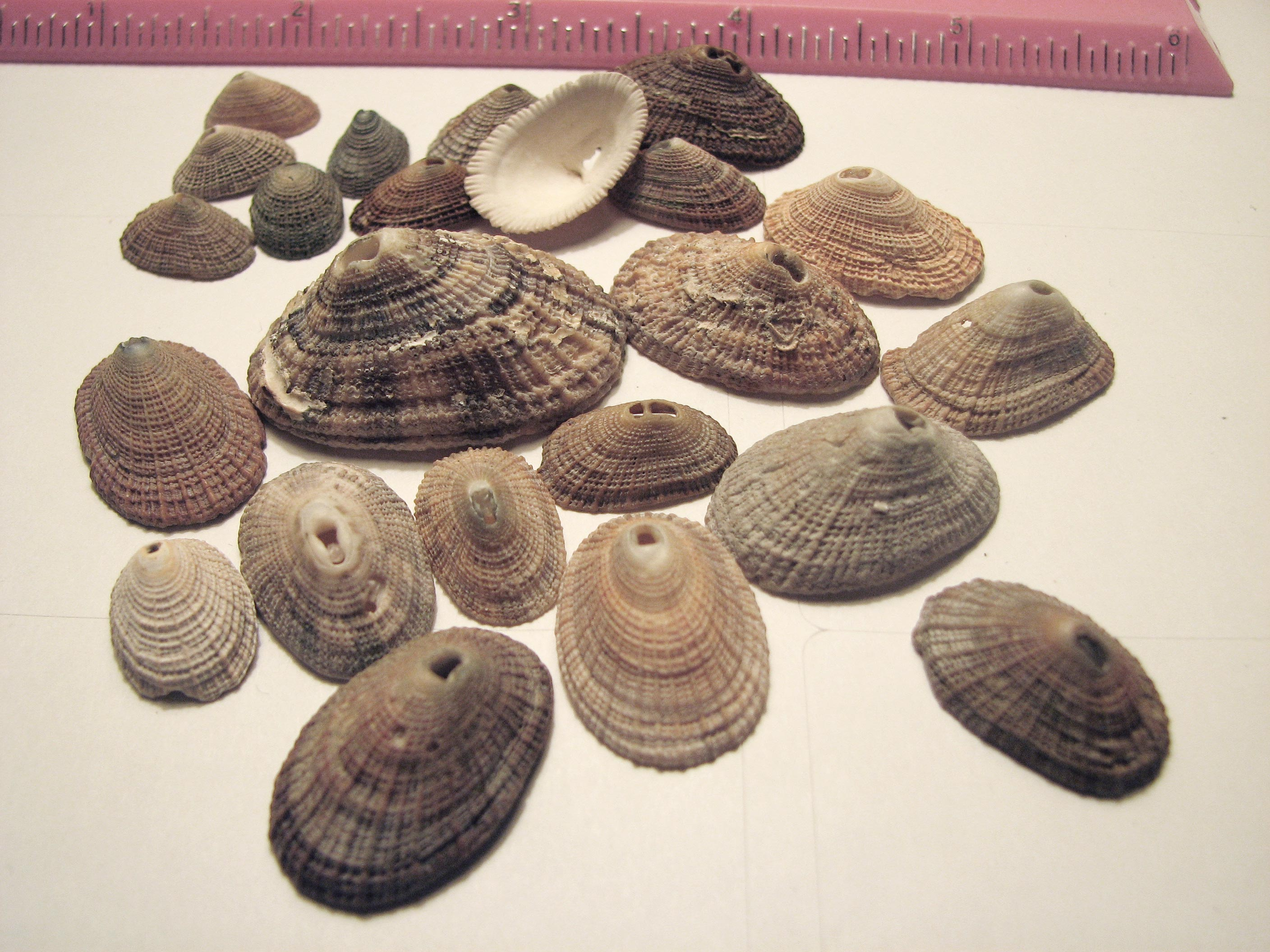
Cayenne keyhole limpets, Diodora cayenensis (Lamarck)

This shell of this species can varies from 15 mm to 50 mm in size and is shaped like a low cone with a small, subcentral keyhole-like opening or orifice on the top of the shell. The shell has an external sculpture of many radiating ribs. Internally, the keyhole opening is outlined by a truncate callus, which has a deep pit on its posterior edge. The keyhole plays an important role in the respiration of this organism by bringing in and expelling water from this shell. This species also possesses an effectively elevated, cone-shaped shell. Diodora cayenensis is considered to be a small to medium species, as the largest one that has been reported is 51 mm in size.

The external coloration of the shell varies from white to pinkish gray or brown sometimes with faint rays, and the interior of the shell is white to gray.

The shell of these organisms have dentate margins due to "erosion" from nearby shells and rocks. This species of limpet lives in inlets and offshore waters attached to rocks or shells and is occasionally found on sponges, as well as washed up on sound and ocean beaches.

== Life habits ==
The Cayenne keyhole limpet is a herbivore, and uses its radula to scrape algae from rocks. Diodora cayenensis can be found in seagrass beds, hard bottoms, and intertidal waters in marine habitats. They can also be found under rocks in shallow areas and on sponges in depths from 0 to 46m. Its powerful foot creates strong suction to keep waves from washing it off the rocks in intertidal and shallow subtidal areas.

Water for respiration and excretion is drawn in under the edge of the shell and exits through the "keyhole" near the peak.

The eggs of this species are yellow and are stuck to rocks. The young hatch and crawl away.

== Ecology ==
Certain crab species, such as stone crabs (Menippe spp.) and spider crabs (Libinia spp.), are opportunistic feeders that may target D. cayenensis. Crabs use their powerful claws to crush the limpet's shell and access its flesh.

Diodora cayenensis primarily feeds on algae, using its radula to scrape these organisms off surfaces such as rocks and coral. It consumes a variety of algal species, contributing to the regulation of algal populations within its habitat.

Diodora cayenensis competes with other herbivorous organisms, such as other limpet species, sea urchins, and herbivorous fish, for access to algae. Competition for food resources may influence the distribution and abundance of D. cayenensis within its habitat.

== Reproduction ==
The Cayenne keyhole limpet reproduces via broadcast spawning, a form of external sexual reproduction typically done by sessile organisms. Because intertidal zones are a constantly changing environment, D. cayenensis release large quantities of eggs into the water in order to increase fertilization rates and in turn the number of offspring. As a reproductive strategy, broadcast spawning relies heavily on turbulent stirring processes in the flow to bring together compatible gametes for fertilization to happen.

== Economic importance ==
Other marine organisms use the ridges of Diodora cayenensis as shelter from predators. D. cayenensis also help filter the ocean water and free it from some suspended sediment, nutrients, and other pollutants. The limpets are edible.
