= Coronium (gastropod) =

Scientific classification
- Kingdom: Animalia
- Phylum: Mollusca
- Class: Gastropoda
- Subclass: Caenogastropoda
- Order: Neogastropoda
- Family: Muricidae
- Subfamily: Trophoninae
- Genus: Coronium; Simone, 1996

Genus of gastropods

Coronium is a genus of sea snails in the family Muricidae, the murex snails or rock snails.

== Species ==
Species within the genus Coronium are:

- Coronium acanthodes (Watson, 1882)
- Coronium coronatum (Penna-Neme & Leme, 1978)
- Coronium elegans Simone, 1996
- Coronium oblongum Simone, 1996
- Coronium petalos Houart & Sellanes, 2010
- Coronium wilhelmense (Ramirez Bohme, 1981)
