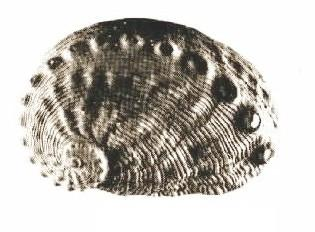
- A shell of Haliotis pourtalesii

Conservation status
- Data Deficient (IUCN 3.1)

Scientific classification
- Kingdom: Animalia
- Phylum: Mollusca
- Class: Gastropoda
- Subclass: Vetigastropoda
- Order: Lepetellida
- Family: Haliotidae
- Genus: Haliotis
- Species: H. pourtalesii

Binomial name
- Haliotis pourtalesii Dall, 1881
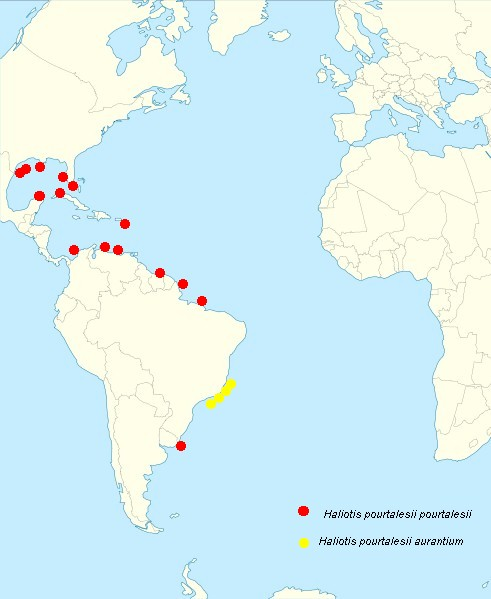

= Haliotis pourtalesii =

Species of gastropod

Haliotis pourtalesii, common name Pourtale's abalone, is a rare species of deepwater sea snail, a marine gastropod mollusk in the family Haliotidae, the abalone.

== Subspecies ==
- Haliotis pourtalesii aurantium Simone, 1998
- Haliotis pourtalesii pourtalesii Dall, 1881

== Distribution ==
The known distribution for Haliotis pourtalesii reported in the literature puts it in a range that extends from the coast of North Carolina to Florida in the United States of America and from there through the Gulf of Mexico, to Cuba, the Caribbean coasts of Colombia, Venezuela and Suriname), the West Indies and to the shores of Brazil.

== Description ==
The maximum recorded shell length is 30 mm. The shell is relatively small, varying from 18 mm to a maximum length of 30 mm. There are 22 to 27 to wavy, spiral cords on the outer surface which is colored a waxy yellow to light-brown, with a few irregular patches of reddish orange. A light-orange band runs from each hole to the edge of the shell. The inside is pearly–white.

"The small shell is painted with a pale brick-red color, with white dots on some of the spirals, The spire is rather elevated, consisting of about two and a half whorls. The small apex is prominent. The shell contains about twenty-five holes, of which five remain open. The margins of these are rather prominent. Outside the row of hole, s the usual sulcus is strongly marked. About midway from the suture to the lines of holes is a raised rib, rather obscure, but differing in different individuals and corresponding to an internal sulcus. Between the central ridges and the suture there are no undulations or transverse ridges of consequence. The sculpture of the shell shows a well marked, rather flattish, spiral, close-set threads, sometimes with a single finer intercalary thread, overlaid by smaller rather compressed transverse ridges, in harmony with the incremental lines. On top of the spirals, the ridges bulge like the threads of worsted on canvas embroidery. The spire is situated well forward and with sides. The inner surface is pearly. The coil of the spire is rather close and the margin of the columella is flattened."

The radula of this species is peculiar in possessing a very narrow lateral tooth. The cephakic tentacles show concentric rings. Within Haliotis, these characteristics can only be found also in Haliotis dalli Henderson, 1915 and in Haliotis dalli roberti Mclean, 1970.

Sometimes young specimens of abalone from other oceans are offered for sale as this species.

== Habitat ==
It has been collected in a bathymetric range between 25 and 230 meters depth, usually on hard substrates.

Minimum recorded depth is 36 m. Maximum recorded depth is 366 m.
