= Coronium wilhelmense =

Scientific classification
- Kingdom: Animalia
- Phylum: Mollusca
- Class: Gastropoda
- Subclass: Caenogastropoda
- Order: Neogastropoda
- Family: Muricidae
- Genus: Coronium
- Species: C. wilhelmense

Binomial name
- Coronium wilhelmense (Ramirez Bohme, 1981)

Synonyms
- Trophon (Enixotrophon) wilhelmensis Ramirez Bohme, 1981

Species of gastropod

Coronium wilhelmense is a species of sea snail, a marine gastropod mollusc, in the family Muricidae, the murex snails or rock snails.
