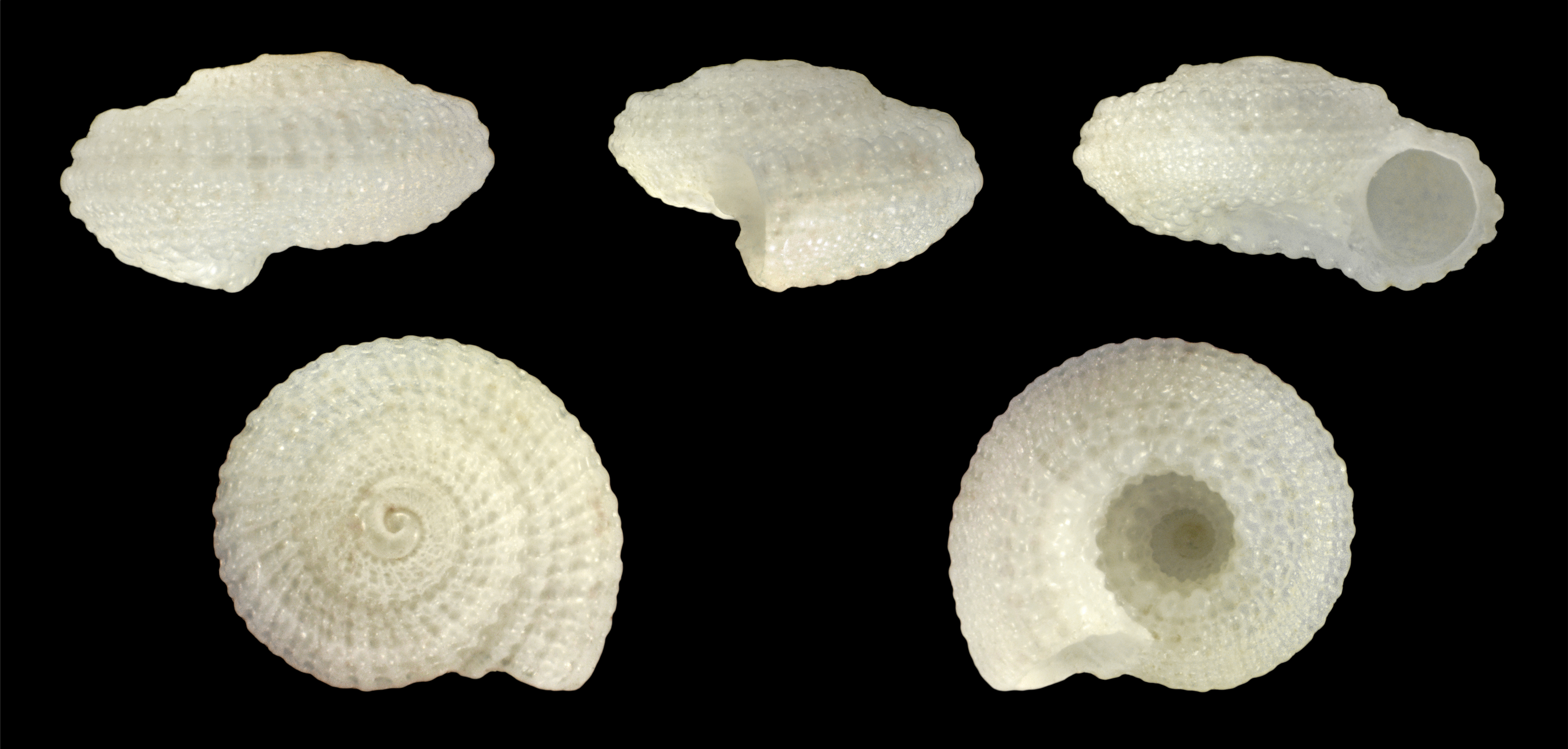
- Pseudotorinia amoena (Murdoch & Suter, 1906)

Scientific classification
- Kingdom: Animalia
- Phylum: Mollusca
- Class: Gastropoda
- Infraclass: "Lower Heterobranchia"
- Superfamily: Architectonicoidea
- Family: Architectonicidae
- Genus: Pseudotorinia; Bronn, 1831

Type species
- † Solarium obtusum Bronn, 1831

Synonyms
- Architectonica (Pseudotorinia) Sacco, 1892; Awarua Mestayer, 1930; Pseudotorina [sic] (misspelling)

= Pseudotorinia =

Pseudotorinia Temporal range: Tertiary–Recent

Genus of gastropods

Pseudotorinia is a genus of sea snails, marine gastropod molluscs in the family Architectonicidae, the staircase shells or sundials.

== Species ==
The following species are included in the genus Pseudotorinia:

- Pseudotorinia "architae-group" (temporary name)
- Pseudotorinia aloysii (Selli, 1973)
- Pseudotorinia amoena (Murdoch & Suter, 1906)
- Pseudotorinia architae (O. G. Costa, 1841)
- Pseudotorinia armillata Bieler, 1993
- Pseudotorinia bullisi Bieler, Merrill & Boss, 1985
- Pseudotorinia colmani (Garrard, 1977)
- Pseudotorinia complanata Poppe & Tagaro, 2026
- Pseudotorinia concava (Thiele, 1925)
- Pseudotorinia delectabilis (Melvill, 1893)
- Pseudotorinia gemmulata (Thiele, 1925)
- Pseudotorinia jonasi Tenório, Barros, Francisco & Silva, 2011
- Pseudotorinia kraussi J.E. Gray in M. E. Gray, 1850
- Pseudotorinia laseronorum (Iredale, 1936)
- Pseudotorinia numulus (Barnard, 1963)
- † Pseudotorinia obtusa (Bronn, 1831)
- Pseudotorinia panamensis (Bartsch, 1918)
- Pseudotorinia phorcysi Cavallari, Salvador & Simone, 2014
- Pseudotorinia sestertius Bieler, 1993
- Pseudotorinia yaroni Bieler, 1993

Species brought into synonymy

- Pseudotorinia retifera (Dall, 1892): synonym of the Pseudotorinia "architae-group"
