= Tritonoranella =

Scientific classification
- Kingdom: Animalia
- Phylum: Mollusca
- Class: Gastropoda
- Subclass: Caenogastropoda
- Order: Littorinimorpha
- Superfamily: Tonnoidea
- Family: Bursidae
- Genus: Tritonoranella; Oyama, 1964

Type species
- Triton ranelloides Reeve, 1844

Genus of gastropods

Tritonoranella is a genus of sea snails, marine gastropod mollusks in the family Bursidae, the frog shells.

== Species ==
- Tritonoranella latitudo (Garrard, 1961)
- Tritonoranella ranelloides (Reeve, 1844)
