= Calliostoma viscardii =

Scientific classification
- Kingdom: Animalia
- Phylum: Mollusca
- Class: Gastropoda
- Subclass: Vetigastropoda
- Order: Trochida
- Family: Calliostomatidae
- Subfamily: Calliostomatinae
- Genus: Calliostoma
- Species: C. viscardii

Binomial name
- Calliostoma viscardii Quinn, 1992

Species of gastropod

Calliostoma viscardii is a species of sea snail, a marine gastropod mollusk in the family Calliostomatidae.

== Description ==
The size of the shell varies between 9 mm and 18 mm.

== Distribution ==
This species occurs in the Atlantic Ocean off Eastern Brazil at depths between 20 m and 45 m.
