= Calliostoma axelolssoni =

Scientific classification
- Kingdom: Animalia
- Phylum: Mollusca
- Class: Gastropoda
- Subclass: Vetigastropoda
- Order: Trochida
- Family: Calliostomatidae
- Subfamily: Calliostomatinae
- Genus: Calliostoma
- Species: C. axelolssoni

Binomial name
- Calliostoma axelolssoni Quinn, 1992

Synonyms
- Calliostoma olssoni Bayer, F.M., 1971 (preoccupied name by Calliostoma olssoni Maury, 1925); Calliostoma (Kombologion) rosewateri auct. non Clench & Turner, 1960; Calliostoma (Kombologion) bairdii rosewateri Rios, 1985

Species of gastropod

Calliostoma axelolssoni, common name Olsson's top shell, is a species of sea snail, a marine gastropod mollusk in the family Calliostomatidae.

== Description ==
The size of the shell varies between 20 mm and 33 mm.

== Distribution ==
This marine species occurs off the Lesser Antilles and Northern Brazil at a depth of 230 m.
