= Eburna lienardii =

- Shell of Eburna lienardii

Scientific classification
- Kingdom: Animalia
- Phylum: Mollusca
- Class: Gastropoda
- Subclass: Caenogastropoda
- Order: Neogastropoda
- Family: Ancillariidae
- Genus: Eburna
- Species: E. lienardii

Binomial name
- Eburna lienardii (Bernardi, 1858)

Species of gastropod

Eburna lienardii, previously known as Ancilla lienardii (during the 20th century) and commonly known as Lienardi's ancilla, is a species of sea snail, a marine gastropod mollusk in the family Ancillariidae. It occurs in the Western Atlantic. In the past, it belonged to the Olividae, within the subfamily Ancillinae Cossmann, 1899.

== Description ==
Eburna lienardii has an oval-elongated shell with a glossy surface. It is colored dark yellow, golden orange or salmon and is almost 5.0 cm (2.0 in) long when adult. It has a moderately high spire, inconspicuous suture, a swollen body whorl and a short siphonal canal. Its outer lip is thin and rounded, the concave columella is sinuous and located close to a large, twisted and deep umbilicus. It also has a prominent callus above the aperture. The aperture, the columellar area, and spiral groove at the base of its body whorl are white in color. There is a narrow white band above the fasciole.

== Distribution and habitat ==
Eburna lienardii is distributed in the northern and northeastern regions of Brazil, and has also been recorded in Colombia and Aruba. It lives on sandy bottoms and among calcareous algae in the neritic zone, at 6–65 m depths. Gastropods in the family Ancillariidae are predators and scavengers.
