= Calliostoma rude =

Scientific classification
- Kingdom: Animalia
- Phylum: Mollusca
- Class: Gastropoda
- Subclass: Vetigastropoda
- Order: Trochida
- Family: Calliostomatidae
- Subfamily: Calliostomatinae
- Genus: Calliostoma
- Species: C. rude

Binomial name
- Calliostoma rude Quinn, 1992

Species of gastropod

Calliostoma rude is a species of sea snail, a marine gastropod mollusk in the family Calliostomatidae.

== Description ==
The size of the shell varies between 7 mm and 14 mm.

== Distribution ==
This species occurs in the Caribbean Sea off French Guiana at depths between 60 m and 84 m.
