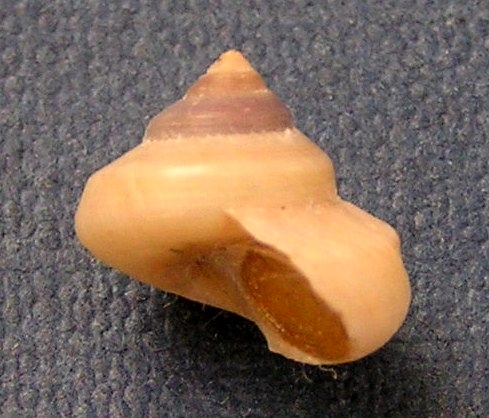
- Apertural view of a shell of Calliostoma coppingeri

Scientific classification
- Kingdom: Animalia
- Phylum: Mollusca
- Class: Gastropoda
- Subclass: Vetigastropoda
- Order: Trochida
- Family: Calliostomatidae
- Subfamily: Calliostomatinae
- Genus: Calliostoma
- Species: C. coppingeri

Binomial name
- Calliostoma coppingeri (E. A. Smith, 1880)

= Calliostoma coppingeri =

Species of gastropod

Calliostoma coppingeri is a species of sea snail, a marine gastropod mollusk in the family Calliostomatidae.

== Description ==
The height of the shell varies between 8 mm and 15 mm. The thin shell thin has a short conical shape. It is rather shining, and somewhat iridescent, owing to the thinness of the calcareous layer above the pearl. It is very pale olive on the body whorl, becoming darker on the upper volutions and reddish at the apex. It is ornamented with a series of minute red dots at the upper part of the whorls, just beneath the suture, and a second series on an angle at the middle of them, with a third series around the periphery of the last volution, and some rather larger spots around the umbilical region. There are seven whorls of which the first three or four are somewhat convex, with three coarse spiral lirae (fine linear elevations on the surface of the shell). The antepenultimate whorl is flat, sloping above, with an acute angle a little above the base, spirally lirated. The lirae are a little raised, with the exception of that at the angle and one immediately beneath the suture, which is very prettily beaded. The penultimate whorl is like the preceding, but with the sculpture less pronounced and the angle nearer the middle. The body whorl is still more feebly sculptured, the beading having become obsolete. It shows two angles at the middle, and the space between the two angles is flat, giving the shell a very angular aspect. The base of the shell is a little convex, concentrically striated, white at the middle, with a conspicuous depression at the umbilical region, which is surrounded by three or four strong lirae. The growth lines are fine. The oblique aperture is irregularly pentagonal, smooth, and beautifully pearly. The columella is arcuate above, obliquely straightish inferiorly.

== Distribution ==
This species occurs in the Atlantic Ocean from Southern Brazil to Argentina.
