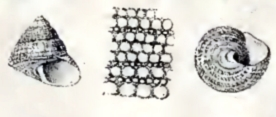
- Drawing with three views of a shell of Calliostoma jucundum

Scientific classification
- Kingdom: Animalia
- Phylum: Mollusca
- Class: Gastropoda
- Subclass: Vetigastropoda
- Order: Trochida
- Family: Calliostomatidae
- Subfamily: Calliostomatinae
- Genus: Calliostoma
- Species: C. jucundum

Binomial name
- Calliostoma jucundum (Gould, 1849)

Synonyms
- Calliostoma hermoseanum Dall, 1927; Calliostoma lahillei Ihering, 1907; Calliostoma rioense Dall, 1890; Trochus jucundus Gould, 1849 (original combination)

= Calliostoma jucundum =

Species of gastropod

Calliostoma jucundum is a species of sea snail, a marine gastropod mollusk in the family Calliostomatidae.

== Description ==
(Original description by Gould) The size of the shell varies between 9.5 mm and 23 mm. The small, solid shell has a low conical shape. It is composed of about six conical whorls, with a slight vertical portion at base. The whorls are girdled with fine, uniform, beaded lines, the alternate ones being generally smaller, sometimes even not beaded, and the two basal ones surrounding the vertical portion being larger. The base of the shell is a little convex, similarly sculptured with about twelve concentric lines, gradually diminishing from the center to the circumference. The umbilical region is colorless, not perforated, and with a groove-like impression beside the columella. The aperture has a rhomboidal-orbiculate shape. The arcuate columella is smooth. The lip is simple. The colors are arranged in radiating flammules, alternately white, strawberry-red, and pale flesh-color, gradually shaded into each other. On the base the dark or light-red are distributed along the granules in a somewhat articulated manner. The shell is nacreous beneath.

== Distribution ==
This species occurs in the Atlantic Ocean off Brazil and Argentina at depths between 10 m and 108 m.
