= Calliostoma rota =

Scientific classification
- Kingdom: Animalia
- Phylum: Mollusca
- Class: Gastropoda
- Subclass: Vetigastropoda
- Order: Trochida
- Family: Calliostomatidae
- Subfamily: Calliostomatinae
- Genus: Calliostoma
- Species: C. rota

Binomial name
- Calliostoma rota Quinn, 1992

Species of gastropod

Calliostoma rota is a species of sea snail, a marine gastropod mollusk in the family Calliostomatidae.

== Description ==
The size of the shell varies between 6 mm and 16 mm.

== Distribution ==
This species occurs in the Atlantic Ocean off Brazil at depths between 30 m and 46 m.
