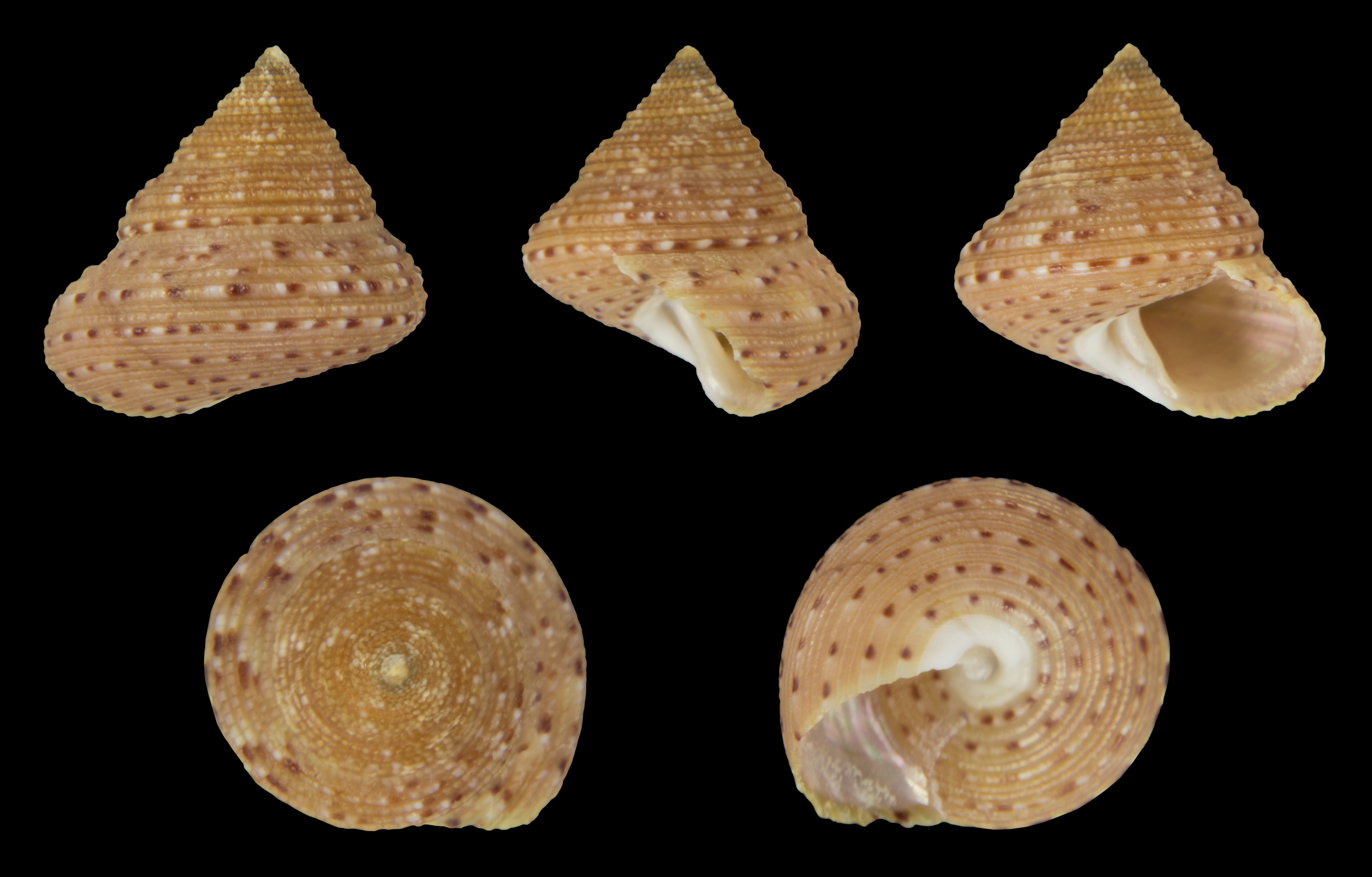

Scientific classification
- Kingdom: Animalia
- Phylum: Mollusca
- Class: Gastropoda
- Subclass: Vetigastropoda
- Order: Trochida
- Family: Calliostomatidae
- Subfamily: Calliostomatinae
- Genus: Calliostoma
- Species: C. depictum

Binomial name
- Calliostoma depictum Dall, 1927

= Calliostoma depictum =

Species of gastropod

Calliostoma depictum is a species of sea snail, a marine gastropod mollusk in the family Calliostomatidae.

== Description ==
The size of the shell varies between 6 mm and 11 mm.

== Distribution ==
This species occurs in the Atlantic Ocean off Eastern Brazil.
