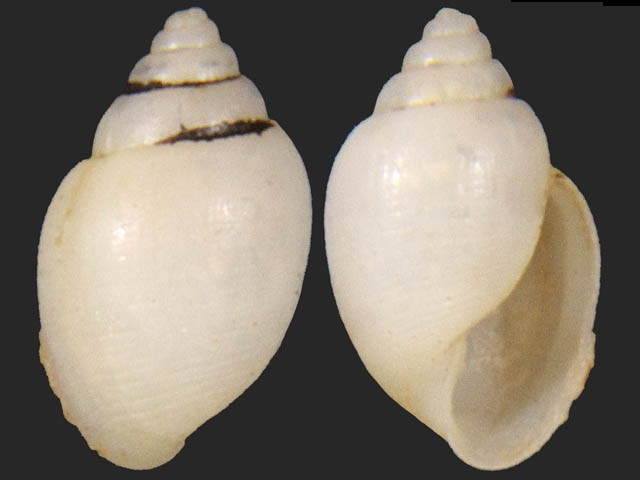
- Shell of Acteon pelecais

Scientific classification
- Kingdom: Animalia
- Phylum: Mollusca
- Class: Gastropoda
- Superfamily: Acteonoidea
- Family: Acteonidae
- Genus: Acteon
- Species: A. pelecais

Binomial name
- Acteon pelecais Ev. Marcus, 1972

= Acteon pelecais =

Species of marine gastropod

Acteon pelecais is a species of sea snail, a marine gastropod mollusc in the family Acteonidae.

== Names ==
Acteon pelecais has been given many names. From 1890 to 1970, it was referred to as "Acteon punctostriatus" with a few other name. However, Eveline Du Bois-Reymond Marcus learned punctostriatus were a different, smaller species. She renamed them "Acteon pelecais Marcus." The modern day term (1971 and beyond) for A. punctostriatus does not mean A. pelecais. Acceptable names include: "Acteon pelecais Marcus" and "Acteon pelecais." (Note: Acteon can be abbreviated to Act. or A.)

== Shell ==
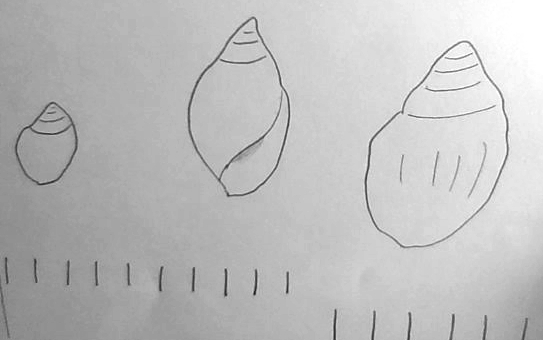
Drawing of Eveline Marcus's 9.5 mm shell and measurements - each tick equals 1 mm

The shell of an Acteon pelecais has less importance than with other families of Gastropods as it is hetero-strophic and extremely fragile like Rixtaxis punctostriatus. It is calcified with a cephalic shield, however. and has a semi-long spine. The shells are a little heavier than those of Rictaxis punctostriatus. They have a semi-long spine and are a little wider than Tominula cumingii. Act. pelecais shells features distinctive flat, spiral grooves and bumps, which sometimes appear as punctures or ribs and are known as striae. These are separated by narrow punctuate furrows.

 TYPICAL SHELL MEASUREMENTS
 Length (mm): 4-10
 Width (mm): 2.8-3.8
 Aperture (mm): 3.0-4.0
 Aperture %: 64.5-66.5
 Spine (mm): 1.2-1.5
 Spine %: 22.8-26.8 [2][5] [6]

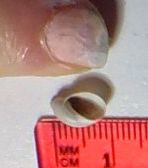
9mm shell compared to a index fingernail (Acteon pelecais are 5-10mm)

The shells of Acteon pelecais and Rictaxis punctostriatus are nearly identical. Both share the same thickness, ratio of diameter, height of spine, height of columnar fold, and extent of spiral striae.As long as the soft (fleshy) parts are not know, it is nearly impossible to fully verify their species.

== Reproductive Systems ==
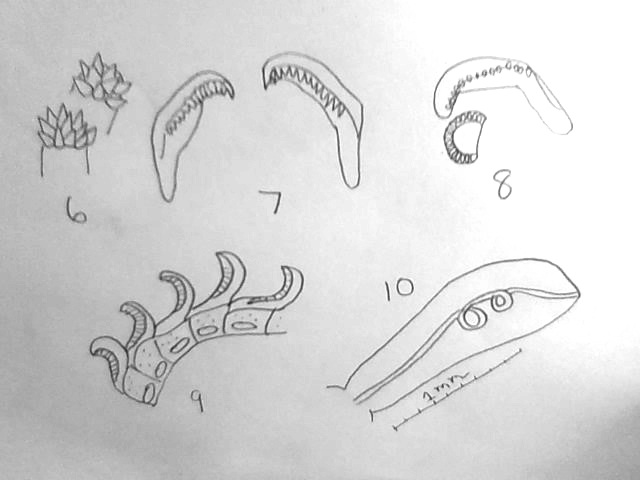
Body parts of Ev. Marcus's Acteon pelecais: 6) jaw platelets 7) innermost radular teeth 8) normal and misformed tooth 9) section of radula 10) penis

Male Act. Pelecais have a:

- Penis, which is 1.4 mm long and 0.45 mm (at its widest point near the tip) in diameter. It cannot extend and is very non-vaginal, simple, and short
- Vas deferens, which is a long muscular tube coiled inside the penis. It transports sperm to the urethra before ejaculating. It is closed throughout its length.
- Spermatheca, which produces and stores sperm
- Prostate epithelium, which is a simple tube containing a mix of high glandular and small ciliated cells like R. punctostriatus

Female Act. Pelecais have a:

- Oviduct, which is a tube transporting eggs
- Bursa copulatrix, which stores and digests sperm

Act. Pelecais eggs are covered in a gelatinous material an attached to other objects with a short stalk.

== Nervous System ==
The cerebro-pleural ganglia is an Acteon pelecais's brain, and it is located near the esophagus. The cerebral ganglia supplies nerves to eyes, tentacles, and other head sensory organs. The pleural ganglia supplies nerves to the mantle cavity. Fused together, they make the cerebro-pleural ganglia. Acteon pelecais also have cephalization. This means their sensory organs and ganglia concentrate towards the front of their body, creating an enlarged head. The rest of their organs and nerves are streptoneurous and shift from the left to the right because of the relocation of their mantle cavity.

== Extra ==
Acteon pelecais have 2 radulas containing many longitudinal rows of inward-curving teeth. These teeth are uniform, numerous, and tiny (7-10µm high). The radula erects to move the teeth which will scrape the food into the digestive tract. New teeth are continuously formed and pushed to the front, similar to a waiting line, because the frontal teeth are constantly wearing down. The formula for its radula is ∞.0.∞. This was discovered in 1971 by Eveline Marcus using a 9.5 mm-high (empty) shell from Ubatuba, Brazil. Both Acteon traski and Act. tornatilis (L.) have similar radulas to the Brazilian species.

Acteon pelecais also have large nuclei (10µm in diameter); their mantle borders are pigment free, and they have a free pallial caecum (1.5 whorls). Their operculum is corneous, 2.0 mm long, and 1.1 mm broad (width 50% of length). They have an elongated, narrow aperture, and a short conical apex. They have a crop to store food before digestion, and it lacks chitinous gizzard plates to help grind up food. Acteon pelecais are carnivorous, and prey on polychaete worms and sedentary Sabellids.

== Distribution ==
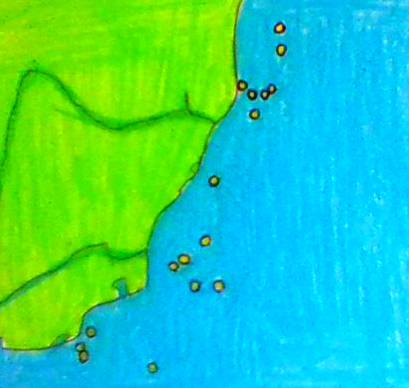
Hand drawn map of Acteon Pelecais sightings in Brazilian waters

This marine species is found in the Atlantic Ocean and the southwest Pacific. It is typically found around the Gulf of Mexico, the West Indies, Uruguay, and down to Brazil in South America. It is most common around Brazil.

According to OBIS, 38.46% of A. pelcais samples were found between 90m-2000m between 1995 and 2012, and all reported sightings have been withing 50 km of Brazil's shore. However, many sites specify they are actually found in shallow water and live up to 85m, not 2000. Acteon pelecais also live near rocky shores underneath the top soil (sand) that has not joined together. This soil/sediment is rough with lower concentrations of clay and silt.

Acteon pelecais descended from Acteon Montfort.

== Discoveries ==
It is believed that C.B. Adams first discovered Acteon pelecais in 1840. He called it an "Acteon punctostriatus."

1890 - Dall found a Act. pelecais dated to Miocene-present day (23.03 Ma to present day)

1893 - Pilsbry found a living Act. pelecais around Massachusetts to the West Indies

1922 - Pilsbry found a Act. pelecais dated to Miocene (23.03-5.33Ma) around the Dominican Republic

1953 - Olsson and Harbison found a Act. pelecais dated to Pliocene (5.33-2.58Ma) around Florida

Jan 30, 1993 - found fossil around Sarasota County, Florida, USA.

Mar 1, 1999 - Florida Meuseum of Natural History found an Act. Pelecais in Sao Paulo, Brazil

Nov 2005 - P. Goncalves working with the Santa Barbara Museum of Natural History found an Act. Pelecais in Rio de Janeiro, Brazil at 20-35m
