= Calliostoma tenebrosum =

Scientific classification
- Kingdom: Animalia
- Phylum: Mollusca
- Class: Gastropoda
- Subclass: Vetigastropoda
- Order: Trochida
- Family: Calliostomatidae
- Subfamily: Calliostomatinae
- Genus: Calliostoma
- Species: C. tenebrosum

Binomial name
- Calliostoma tenebrosum Quinn, 1992

Species of gastropod

Calliostoma tenebrosum is a species of sea snail, a marine gastropod mollusk in the family Calliostomatidae.

== Description ==
The size of the shell varies between 8 mm and 15 mm.

== Distribution ==
This species occurs in the Atlantic Ocean off Eastern Brazil.
