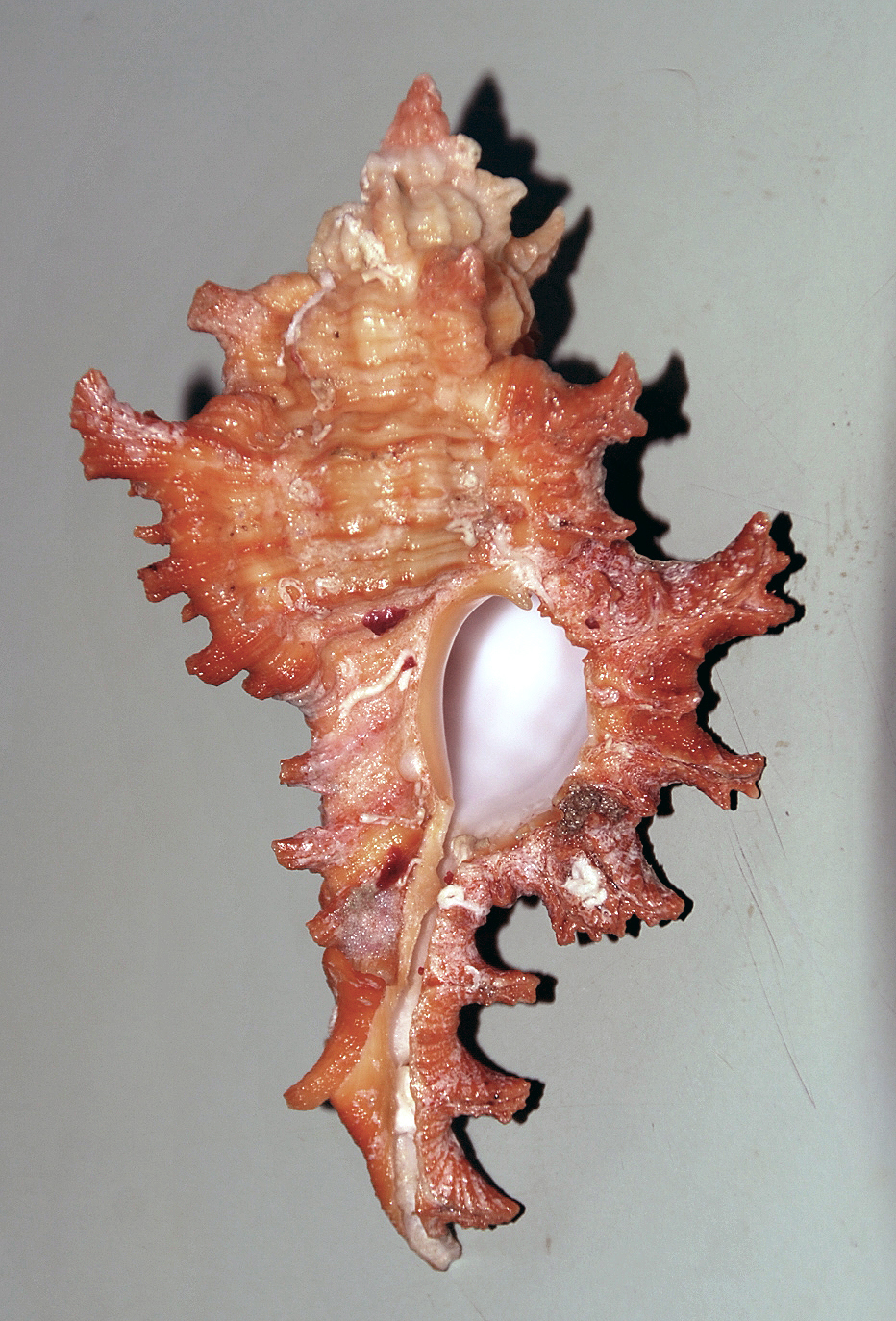

Scientific classification
- Kingdom: Animalia
- Phylum: Mollusca
- Class: Gastropoda
- Subclass: Caenogastropoda
- Order: Neogastropoda
- Family: Muricidae
- Genus: Chicoreus
- Species: C. spectrum

Binomial name
- Chicoreus spectrum (Reeve, 1846)

Synonyms
- Chicoreus (Triplex) spectrum (Reeve, 1846)· alternate representation; Murex (Chicoreus) argo Clench & Farfante, 1945; Murex argo Clench & Farfante, 1945; Murex imbricatus Higgins & Marratt, 1877; Murex spectrum Reeve, 1846

= Chicoreus spectrum =

Species of gastropod

Chicoreus spectrum is a species of sea snail, a marine gastropod mollusc in the family Muricidae, the murex snails or rock snails.

== Description ==
The shell size varies between 23 mm and 165 mm. Colors can vary from a bright orange, to a reddish brown.

== Distribution ==
This uncommon species is distributed in the Caribbean Sea and the Lesser Antilles; in the Atlantic Ocean off Brazil, living at depths from 30–100 metres
