= Calliostoma nordenskjoldi =

Scientific classification
- Kingdom: Animalia
- Phylum: Mollusca
- Class: Gastropoda
- Subclass: Vetigastropoda
- Order: Trochida
- Family: Calliostomatidae
- Subfamily: Calliostomatinae
- Genus: Calliostoma
- Species: C. nordenskjoldi

Binomial name
- Calliostoma nordenskjoldi Strebel, 1908

Species of gastropod

Calliostoma nordenskjoldi is a species of sea snail, a marine gastropod mollusk in the family Calliostomatidae.

== Description ==
The size of the shell varies between 6 mm and 14 mm.

== Distribution ==
This marine species occurs in the Atlantic Ocean off Brazil to Patagonia at depths between 60 m and 100 m.
