= Calliostoma moscatellii =

Scientific classification
- Kingdom: Animalia
- Phylum: Mollusca
- Class: Gastropoda
- Subclass: Vetigastropoda
- Order: Trochida
- Family: Calliostomatidae
- Subfamily: Calliostomatinae
- Genus: Calliostoma
- Species: C. moscatellii

Binomial name
- Calliostoma moscatellii Quinn, 1992

Synonyms
- Calliostoma carcellesi auct. non Clench & Aguayo, 1940

Species of sea snail

Calliostoma moscatellii is a species of sea snail, a marine gastropod mollusk in the family Calliostomatidae.

== Description ==
The size of the shell varies between 17 mm and 24 mm.

Calliostomoma moscatellii is a marine gastropod mollusk belonging to the family Calliostomatidae. The species was first described by Quinn in 1992. Its shell typically reaches a size of around 21.5 mm, and specimens have been recorded from Santana Island, located off the state of Rio de Janeiro, Brazil.

Members of the order Archaeogastropoda, including C. moscatellii, are gonochoric (having separate male and female individuals) and reproduce via broadcast spawning. The life cycle involves embryos developing into planktonic trochophore larvae, which subsequently transform into juvenile veligers before reaching maturity.

This species is primarily distributed in the tropical western Atlantic region, in marine environments. As with other Calliostomatidae, the shell structure is solid and often conical, featuring detailed sculpturing and coloration that distinguishes it from closely related species.

== Distribution ==
This species occurs in the Atlantic Ocean off Southern Brazil at depths between 50 m and 200 m.
