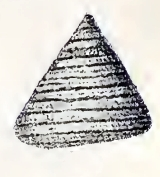
- Drawing of a shell of Calliostoma gemmosum

Scientific classification
- Kingdom: Animalia
- Phylum: Mollusca
- Class: Gastropoda
- Subclass: Vetigastropoda
- Order: Trochida
- Family: Calliostomatidae
- Subfamily: Calliostomatinae
- Genus: Calliostoma
- Species: C. gemmosum

Binomial name
- Calliostoma gemmosum (Reeve, 1842)

Synonyms
- Trochus gemmosum Reeve, 1842 (original combination)

= Calliostoma gemmosum =

Species of gastropod

Calliostoma gemmosum is a species of sea snail, a marine gastropod mollusk in the family Calliostomatidae.

== Description ==
The size of the shell varies between 13 mm and 30 mm. The solid shell has a rather tumidly conical shape. The whorls are slopingly convex, densely strongly grained, here and there linearly engraved. The lines are obliquely minutely crenulated. The basal margin is obtusely rounded. The shell has a golden straw color, engraved lines chocolate-purple. It is strongly grained upon a bright golden straw-color, enlaced with engraved lines of a deep chocolate-purple.

== Distribution ==
This species occurs in the Caribbean Sea off Venezuela and in the Atlantic Ocean off Brazil.
