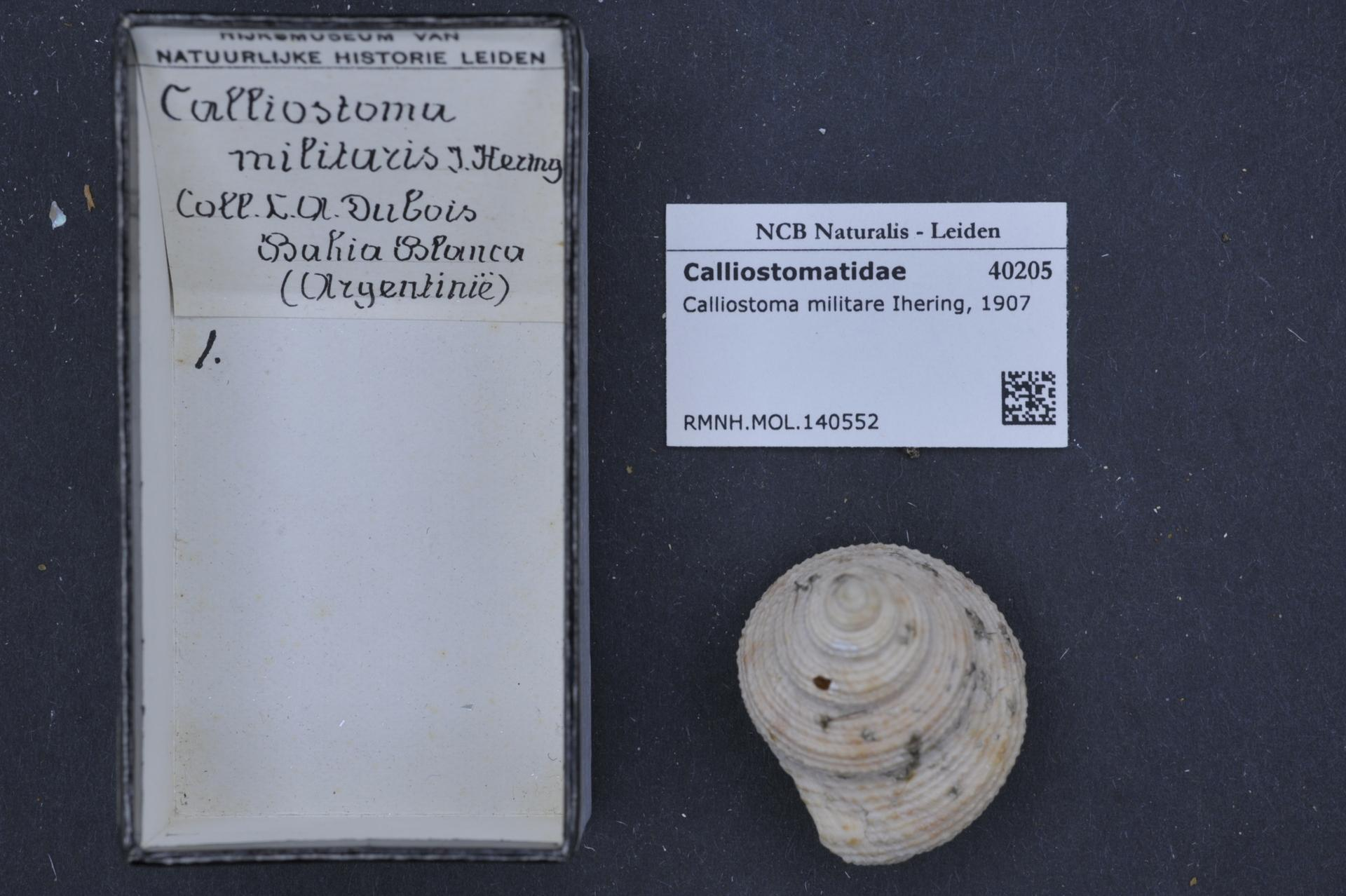

Scientific classification
- Kingdom: Animalia
- Phylum: Mollusca
- Class: Gastropoda
- Subclass: Vetigastropoda
- Order: Trochida
- Family: Calliostomatidae
- Genus: Calliostoma
- Species: C. militare

Binomial name
- Calliostoma militare Ihering, 1907

Synonyms
- Calliostoma amazonicum Finlay, 1930; Calliostoma bellicosum Ihering, 1907; Calliostoma dalli Ihering, 1907; Calliostoma iheringi Dall, 1927; Calliostoma quequense Carcelles, 1944; Neocalliostoma militare (Ihering, 1907)

= Calliostoma militare =

Species of gastropod

Calliostoma militare, common name Von Ihering's top shell, is a species of sea snail, a marine gastropod mollusk in the family Calliostomatidae.

== Description ==
The size of the shell varies between 15 mm and 47 mm. Specimens are typically yellowish or brownish, accented by areas of white or red. Among other Calliostomatidae species, militare is notable for having a pseudoproboscis, as well as an intestinal loop located outside the haemocoel.

== Distribution ==
This species occurs in the Atlantic Ocean off Brazil and Argentina.
