= Calliostoma carcellesi =

Scientific classification
- Kingdom: Animalia
- Phylum: Mollusca
- Class: Gastropoda
- Subclass: Vetigastropoda
- Order: Trochida
- Family: Calliostomatidae
- Subfamily: Calliostomatinae
- Genus: Calliostoma
- Species: C. carcellesi

Binomial name
- Calliostoma carcellesi Clench & Aguayo, 1940

Species of gastropod

Calliostoma carcellesi (Carcelle's top shell) is a species of sea snail, a marine gastropod mollusk in the family Calliostomatidae.

== Description ==
The size of the shell varies between 20 mm and 24 mm.

== Distribution ==
This marine species occurs off Argentina at a depth of about 50 m.
