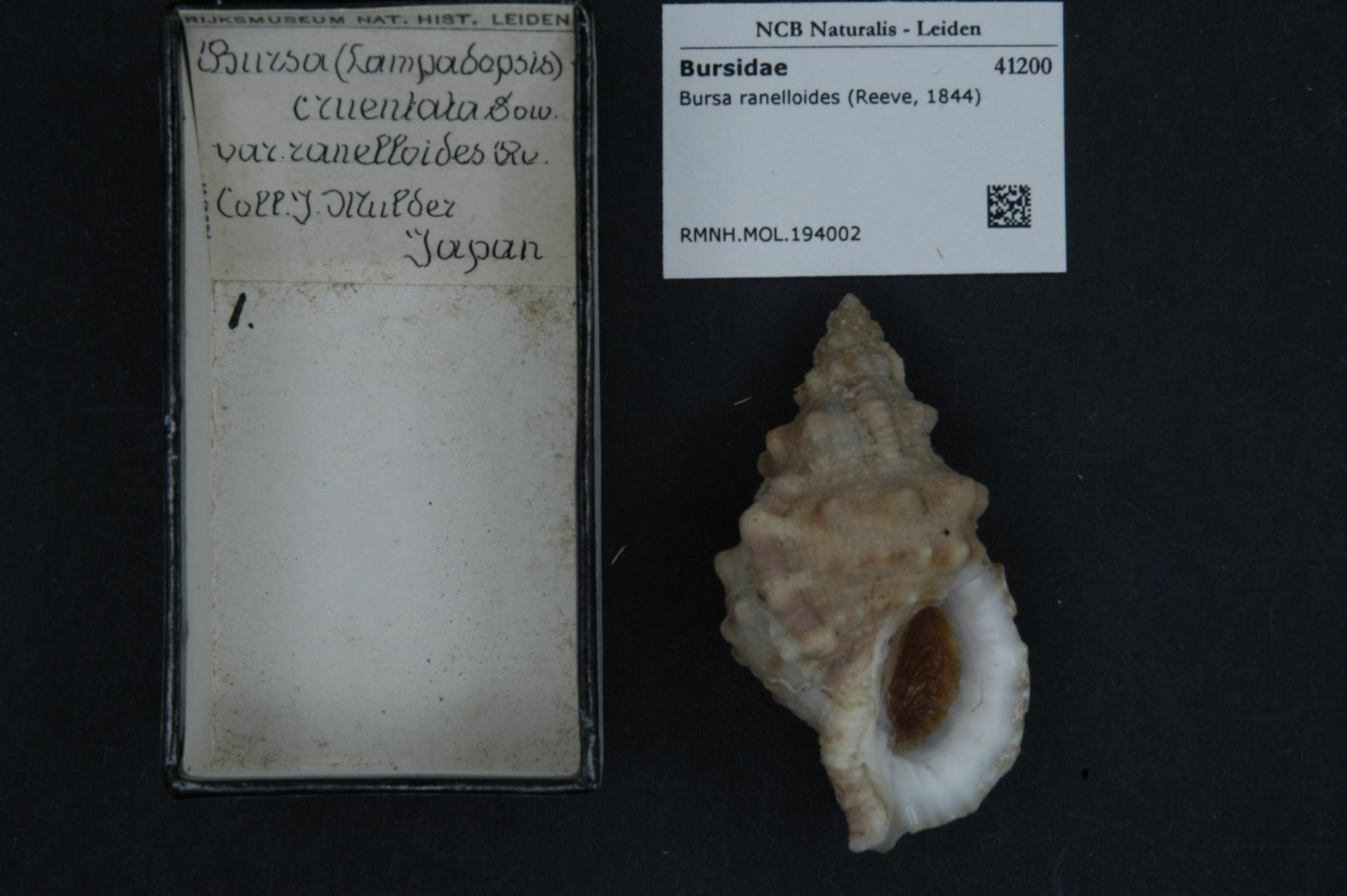
- Tritonoranella ranelloides shell

Scientific classification
- Kingdom: Animalia
- Phylum: Mollusca
- Class: Gastropoda
- Subclass: Caenogastropoda
- Order: Littorinimorpha
- Family: Bursidae
- Genus: Tritonoranella
- Species: T. ranelloides

Binomial name
- Tritonoranella ranelloides (Reeve, 1844)

Synonyms
- Bursa (Bufonariella) ranelloides (Reeve, 1844); Bursa (Bufonariella) ranelloides ranelloides (Reeve, 1844); Bursa (Bufonariella) ranelloides tenuisculpta Dautzenberg & H. Fischer, 1906 ·; Bursa (Colubrellina) benvegnuae Penna-Neme & Leme, 1978; Bursa (Colubrinella) canarica Nordsieck, 1975; Bursa (Colubrellina) ranelloides ranelloides (Reeve, L.A., 1844); Bursa (Lampas) ranelloides (Reeve, 1844); Bursa (Lampas) ranelloides var. tenuigranosa Dautzenberg & H. Fischer, 1906; Bursa benvegnuae Penna-Neme & Leme, 1978 ·; Bursa finlayi McGinty, 1962; Bursa pygmaea Kosuge, 1979; Bursa ranelloides (Reeve, 1844); Bursa ranelloides ranelloides (Reeve, 1844); Bursa ranelloides tenuisculpta Dautzenberg & H. Fischer, 1906; Bursa tenuisculpta Dautzenberg & H. Fischer, 1906; Ranella ranelloides (Reeve, 1844); Simpulum papillosum A. Adams, 1870; Triton ranelloides Reeve, 1844

= Tritonoranella ranelloides =

Species of gastropod

Tritonoranella ranelloides is a species of sea snail, a marine gastropod mollusc in the family Bursidae, the frog shells.

Deepwater Frog Shell

== Distribution ==
This species occurs in European waters, the Caribbean Sea and the Gulf of Mexico; and off South Africa, the Philippines and Japan.

Deepwater Frog Shell

== Description ==
The maximum recorded shell length of Tritonoranella ranelloides tenuisculpta is 75 mm.

== Habitat ==
Minimum recorded depth of Tritonoranella ranelloides tenuisculpta is 30 m. Maximum recorded depth is 250 m.
