= Coronium coronatum =

Scientific classification
- Kingdom: Animalia
- Phylum: Mollusca
- Class: Gastropoda
- Subclass: Caenogastropoda
- Order: Neogastropoda
- Family: Muricidae
- Genus: Coronium
- Species: C. coronatum

Binomial name
- Coronium coronatum (Penna-Neme & Leme, 1978)

Synonyms
- Columbarium coronatum Penna-Neme & Leme, 1978

Species of gastropod

Coronium coronatum is a species of sea snail, a marine gastropod mollusc in the family Muricidae, the murex snails or rock snails.
