= Calliostoma brunneopictum =

Scientific classification
- Kingdom: Animalia
- Phylum: Mollusca
- Class: Gastropoda
- Subclass: Vetigastropoda
- Order: Trochida
- Family: Calliostomatidae
- Subfamily: Calliostomatinae
- Genus: Calliostoma
- Species: C. brunneopictum

Binomial name
- Calliostoma brunneopictum Quinn, 1992

Species of gastropod

Calliostoma brunneopictum is a species of sea snail, a marine gastropod mollusk in the family Calliostomatidae.

== Description ==
The size of the shell varies between 6 mm and 8.5 mm.

== Distribution ==
This species occurs in the Atlantic Ocean off Southern Brazil at depths between 50 m and 80 m.
