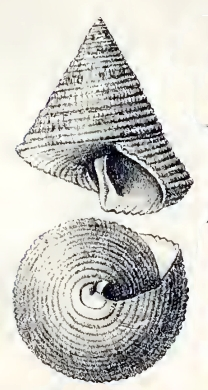
- Drawing with two views of a shell of Calliostoma apicinum

Scientific classification
- Kingdom: Animalia
- Phylum: Mollusca
- Class: Gastropoda
- Subclass: Vetigastropoda
- Order: Trochida
- Family: Calliostomatidae
- Subfamily: Calliostomatinae
- Genus: Calliostoma
- Species: C. apicinum

Binomial name
- Calliostoma apicinum Dall, 1881

Synonyms
- Calliostoma roseolum auct. non Dall, 1881

= Calliostoma apicinum =

Species of gastropod

Calliostoma apicinum is a species of sea snail, a marine gastropod mollusk in the family Calliostomatidae.

== Description ==
The height of the shell attains 10 mm. The elevated, thin, rather solid shell has a conical shape. It consists of six whorls. These whorls and the base of the shell are flattened. The sutures are hardly visible. The body whorl is subangulated, but not carinated, on the periphery. The nucleus is prominent, bubble-shaped, shining opaque white. The second whorl is deep rose-pink, with three longitudinal beaded ribs. The rest of shell is yellowish-white, with indistinct clouds of brown transversely disposed on the upper whorls. The lower rib on the second, third and part of the fourth whorls contain somewhat larger beads than the rest, crowning the suture. The upper side of the last whorl has about nine revolving beaded ribs with a slight tendency to run in pairs, beginning at the periphery. The base contains eleven somewhat flattened ribs only the two next the pillar beaded, the others crossed by evident lines of growth, radiating in a wavy manner. The umbilicus is a hardly visible puncture. The columella is grooved, hardly thickened. The subrectangular aperture is not very oblique, crenulated (especially below) by the ends of the ribs.

== Distribution ==
This marine species occurs off Barbados and off Cuba at depths between 100 m and 175 m.
