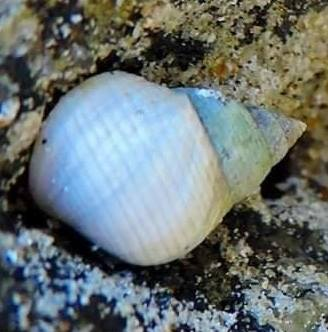
- A live specimen of L. flava from Brazil

Scientific classification
- Kingdom: Animalia
- Phylum: Mollusca
- Class: Gastropoda
- Subclass: Caenogastropoda
- Order: Littorinimorpha
- Family: Littorinidae
- Genus: Littoraria
- Species: L. flava

Binomial name
- Littoraria flava (King & Broderip, 1832)

Synonyms
- Littorina columellaris d'Orbigny, 1840; Littorina flava King, 1832 (basionym); Littorina fusciventris Boettger, 1891; Melaraphe columellaris (d'Orbigny, 1840); Melaraphe flava (King, 1832)

= Littoraria flava =

Species of gastropod

Littoraria flava is a species of sea snail, a marine gastropod mollusk in the family Littorinidae, the winkles or periwinkles.

== Distribution ==
Littoraria flava is currently distributed from the Caribbean to Brazil, including Cuba, Venezuela, Jamaica, Puerto Rico, Guadeloupe, St. Vincent and the Grenadines, Trinidad and Tobago, Guyana and Suriname. Its range is from 22.07°N to 29°S; 81°W to 34.9°W.

== Description ==
The maximum recorded shell length is 20 mm.

== Habitat ==
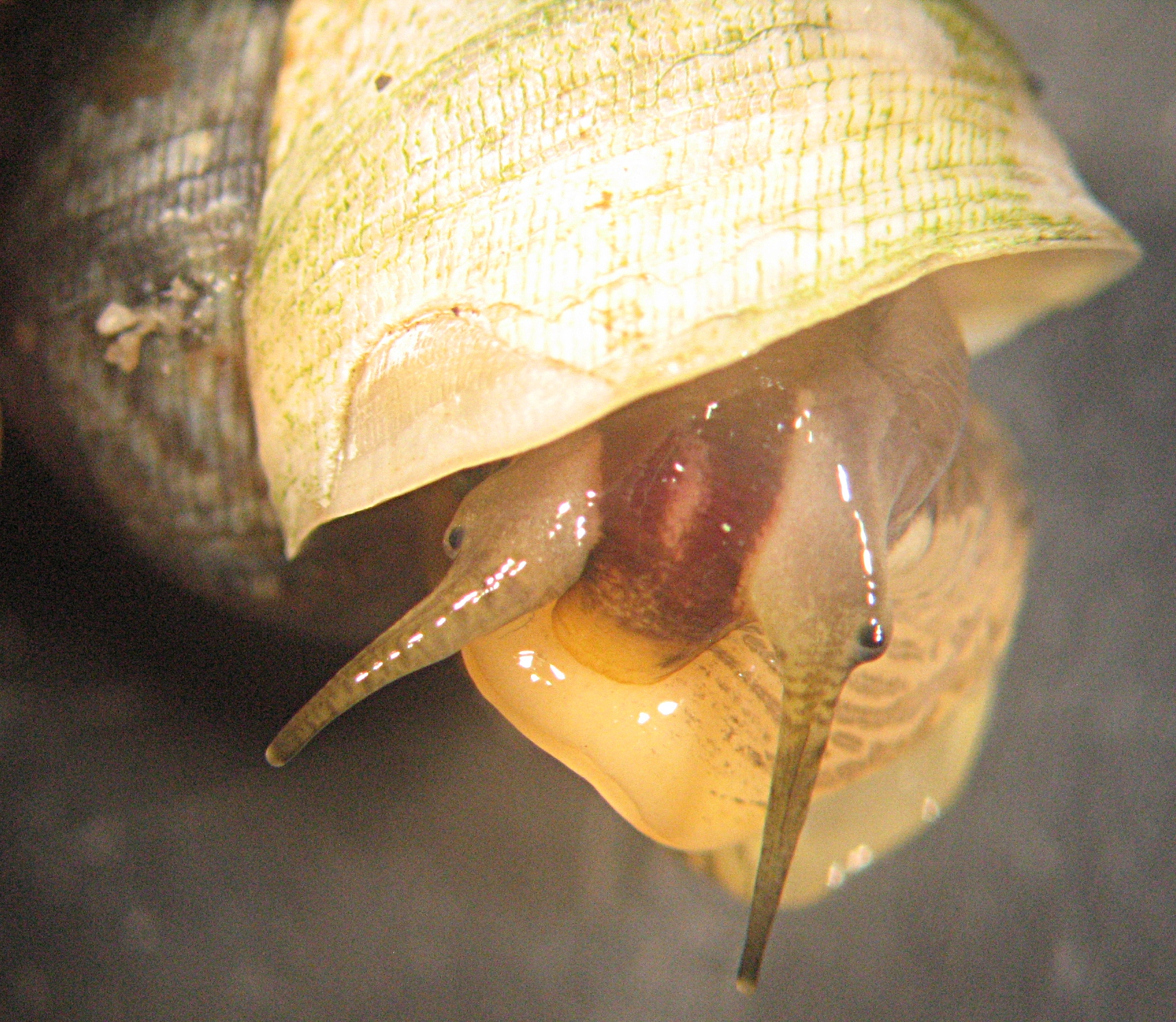
A Littoraria flava showing head

Minimum recorded depth is -1.5 m. Maximum recorded depth is 0 m.
