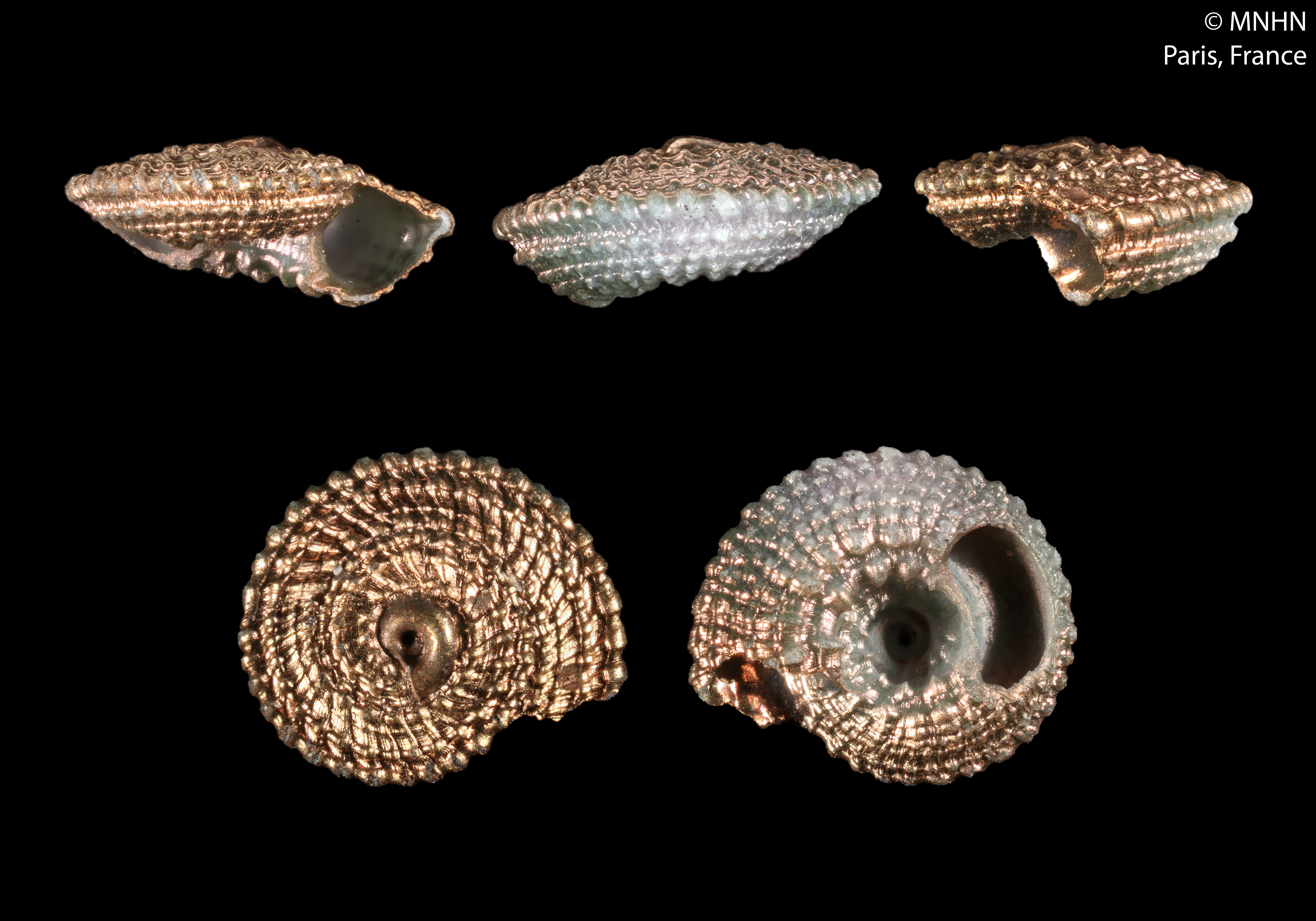
- Shell of Pseudotorinia phorcysi (holotype at MNHN, Paris)

Scientific classification
- Kingdom: Animalia
- Phylum: Mollusca
- Class: Gastropoda
- Family: Architectonicidae
- Genus: Pseudotorinia
- Species: P. phorcysi

Binomial name
- Pseudotorinia phorcysi Cavallari, Salvador & Simone, 2014

= Pseudotorinia phorcysi =

Species of gastropod

Pseudotorinia phorcysi is a species of sea snail, a marine gastropod mollusc in the family Architectonicidae, the staircase shells or sundials.

== Description ==
The size of the shell attains 2.69 mm.

== Distribution ==
This marine species occurs off South-east Brazil.
