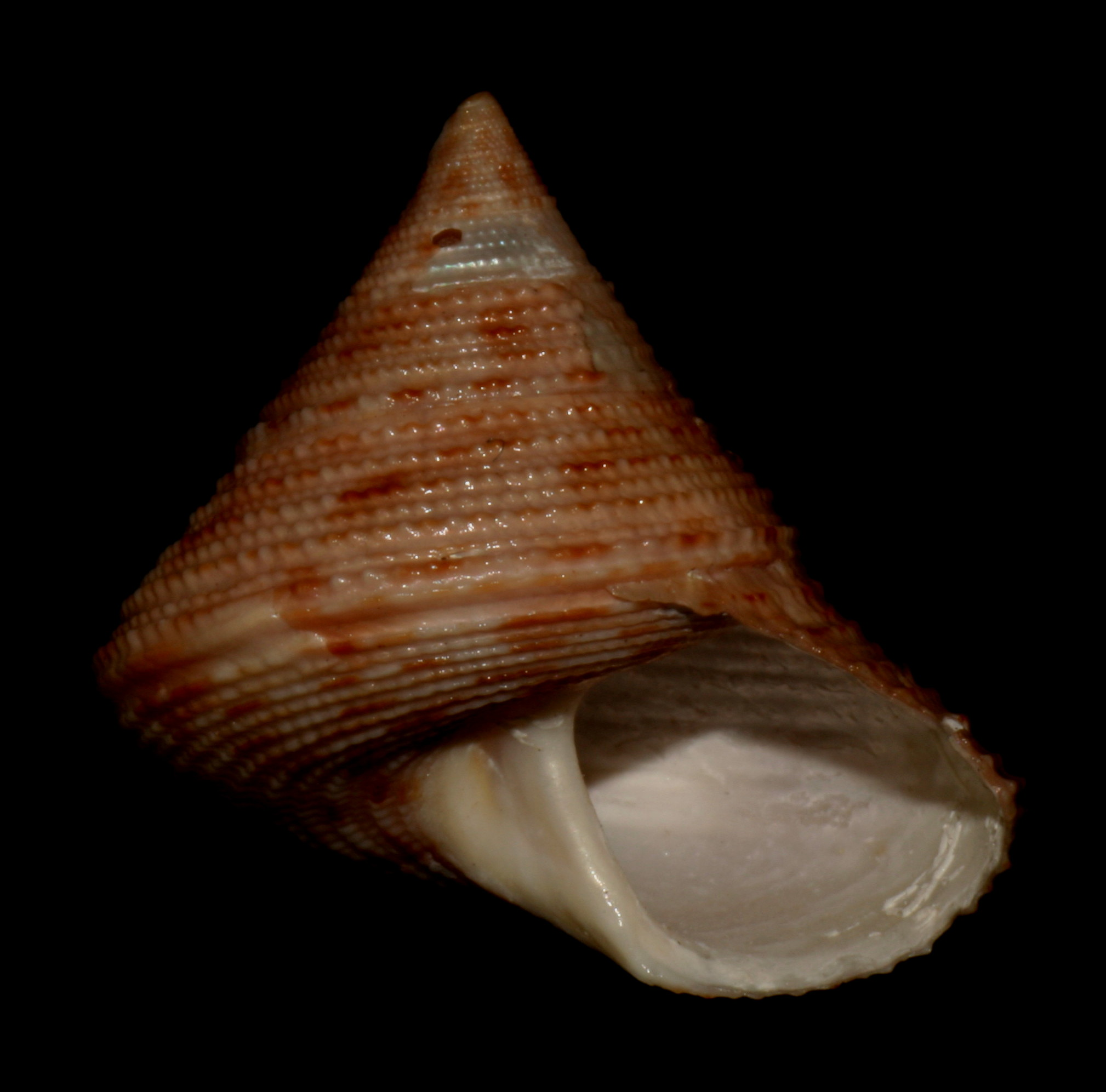
- A shell of Calliostoma bullisi Clench & Turner, 1960, 27.4 mm height by 27.4 mm diameter, trawled at 70 m off the coast of Sierra Leone, Africa

Scientific classification
- Kingdom: Animalia
- Phylum: Mollusca
- Class: Gastropoda
- Subclass: Vetigastropoda
- Order: Trochida
- Family: Calliostomatidae
- Genus: Calliostoma
- Species: C. bullisi

Binomial name
- Calliostoma bullisi Clench & Turner, 1960

= Calliostoma bullisi =

Species of gastropod

Calliostoma bullisi, common name Bullis's top shell, is a species of sea snail, a marine gastropod mollusk in the family Calliostomatidae.

== Description ==
The shell grows to a height of 35 mm.

== Distribution ==
This species occurs in the Atlantic Ocean off East Brazil at depths between 28 m and 73 m; in the Caribbean Ocean off Isla Margarita, Venezuela.
