= Coronium elegans =

Scientific classification
- Kingdom: Animalia
- Phylum: Mollusca
- Class: Gastropoda
- Subclass: Caenogastropoda
- Order: Neogastropoda
- Family: Muricidae
- Genus: Coronium
- Species: C. elegans

Binomial name
- Coronium elegans Simone, 1996

Species of gastropod

Coronium elegans is a species of sea snail, a marine gastropod mollusc in the family Muricidae, the murex snails or rock snails. It is found off the southeastern coast of Brazil.

== Description ==
Shell size 73-78 mm.

== Distribution ==
Western Atlantic, trawled at 100-150 m. off Santa Catarina, Brazil.
