= Calliostoma hassler =

Scientific classification
- Kingdom: Animalia
- Phylum: Mollusca
- Class: Gastropoda
- Subclass: Vetigastropoda
- Order: Trochida
- Family: Calliostomatidae
- Subfamily: Calliostomatinae
- Genus: Calliostoma
- Species: C. hassler

Binomial name
- Calliostoma hassler Clench & Aguayo, 1939

Synonyms
- Calliostoma (Astele) hassler Clench & Aguayo, 1939

Species of gastropod

Calliostoma hassler, common name Hassler's top shell, is a species of sea snail, a marine gastropod mollusk in the family Calliostomatidae.

== Description ==
The length of the shell varies between 25 mm and 32 mm.

== Distribution ==
This species occurs in the Atlantic Ocean off Eastern Brazil at depths between 40 m and 64 m.
