= List of gastropods described in 2018 =

This list of gastropods described in 2018 is a list of new taxa of snails and slugs of every kind that have been described (following the rules of the ICZN) during the year 2018. The list only includes taxa at the rank of genus or species.

== Marine gastropods ==
=== New species ===
==== Vetigastropoda ====
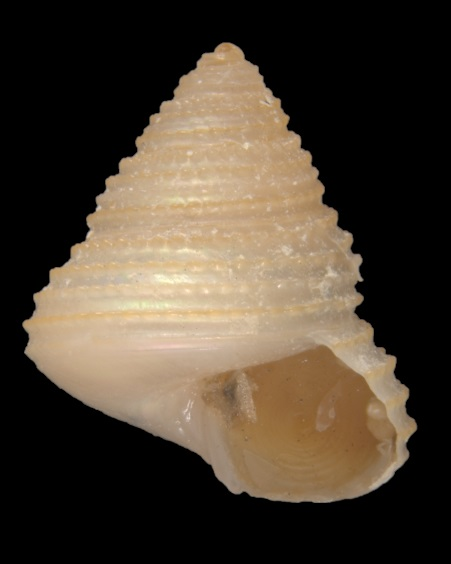
A subadult shell of Calliostoma melliferum from Brazil

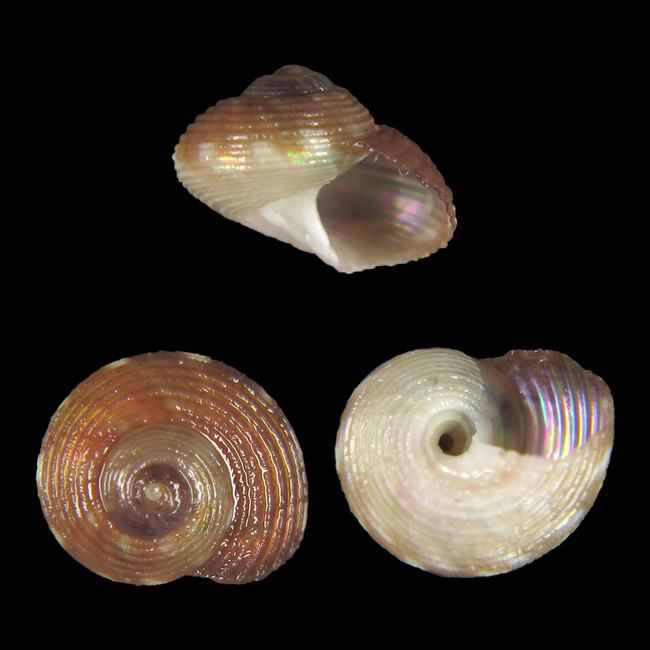
Different views of a shell off Pseudotalopia rainesi

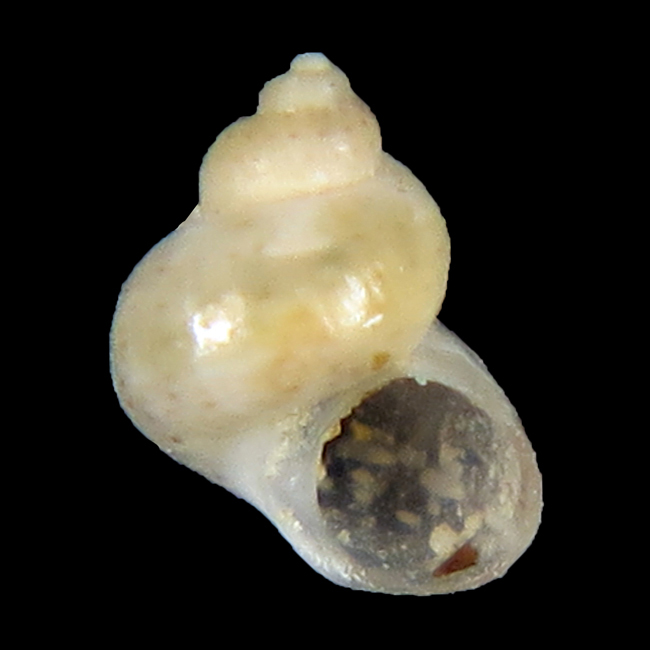
A shell off Tricolia delicata

The following vetigastropod species were described in 2018:

- Angaria guntheri Thach, 2018
- Angaria kronenbergi Thach, 2018
- Angaria moolenbeeki Thach, 2018
- Angaria petuchi Thach, 2018
- Angaria walleri Thach, 2018
- Arene alta Rubio & Rolán, 2018
- Arene descensa Rubio & Rolán, 2018
- Arene guyanensis Rubio & Rolán, 2018
- Arene lychee Cavallari & Simone, 2018
- Astralium dekkeri Thach, 2018
- Bayerotrochus quiquandoni Cossignani, 2018
- Brookula murawskii Fernández-Garcés, Rubio & Rolán, 2018
- Calliostoma katorii Poppe, Tagaro & Goto, 2018
- Calliostoma maekawai Poppe, Tagaro & Goto, 2018
- Calliostoma melliferum Cavallari & Simone, 2018
- Calliostoma spesa J.-L. Zhang, Wei & S.-P. Zhang, 2018
- Calliotropis monsyu S.-I Huang, M.-H. Lin & C.-L. Chen, 2018
- Calliotropis yapensis S.-Q. Zhang & S.-P. Zhang, 2018
- Emarginula renkeri Engl, 2018
- Jujubinus ajachaensis Martín-González & Vera-Peláez, 2018
- Jujubinus browningleeae Smriglio, Mariottini & Swinnen, 2018
- Otukaia beringensis Tuskes & R. Clark, 2018
- Pseudotalopia rainesi Poppe, Tagaro & Goto, 2018
- Skenea costulata Sbrana & Siracusa, 2018
- Toroidia merianae Hoffman & Freiwald, 2018
- Toroidia porcupinensis Hoffman & Freiwald, 2018
- Tricolia delicata Poppe, Tagaro & Goto, 2018

==== Neogastropoda ====
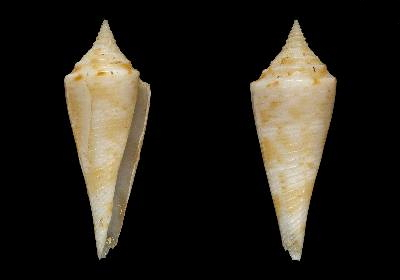
Apertural (left) and abapertural (right) views of a shell of Conaspella lemuriana

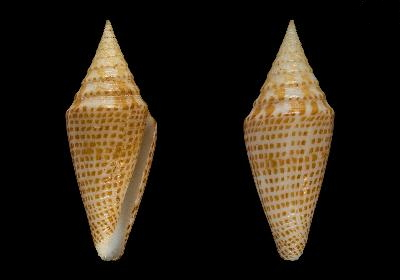
Apertural (left) and abapertural (right) views of a shell of Conus aequiquadratus

The following neogastropod species were described in 2018:

- Adinassa barcai Horro, Schönherr & Rolán, 2018
- Afonsoconus crosnieri Tenorio, Monnier & Puillandre, 2018
- Africonus freitasi Tenorio, Afonso, Rolán, Pires, Vasconcelos, Abalde & Zardoya, 2018
- Africonus josegeraldoi Cossignani & Fiadeiro, 2018
- Africonus padarosae Cossignani & Fiadeiro, 2018
- Coltroconus bianchii Petuch & Berschauer, 2018
- Conasprella lemuriana Monnier, Tenorio, Bouchet & Puillandre, 2018
- Conasprella gubernatrix Petuch & Berschauer, 2018
- Conus aequiquadratus Monnier, Tenorio, Bouchet & Puillandre, 2018
- Conus cazalisoi Cossignani & Fiadeiro, 2018
- Conus cymbioides Monnier, Tenorio, Bouchet & Puillandre, 2018
- Conus galeyi Monnier, Tenorio, Bouchet & Puillandre, 2018
- Darioconus rosiae Monnier, Batifoix & Limpalaër, 2018
- Jaspidiconus crabosi Petuch & Berschauer, 2018
- Jaspidiconus icapui Petuch & Berschauer, 2018
- Jaspidiconus itapua Petuch & Berschauer, 2018
- Jaspidiconus joanae Petuch & Berschauer, 2018
- Jaspidiconus keppensi Petuch & Berschauer, 2018
- Parabuccinum politum Pastorino, 2018
- Pionoconus easoni Petuch & Berschauer, 2018
- Poremskiconus tourosensis Petuch & Berschauer, 2018

==== Neritimorpha ====
- Nerita (Cymostyla) eichhorsti Krijnen, Gras & Vink, 2018
- Nerita eichhorsti Krijnen, Gras & Vink, 2018

==== Nudibranchia ====
- Bohuslania matsmichaeli Korshunova, Lundin, Malmberg, Picton & Martynov, 2018
- Platydoris guarani Lima & Simone, 2018

=== New genera ===
- Bohuslania Korshunova, Lundin, Malmberg, Picton & Martynov, 2018
- Pictoconus Limpalaër & Monnier, 2018

== Land gastropods ==
=== New species ===
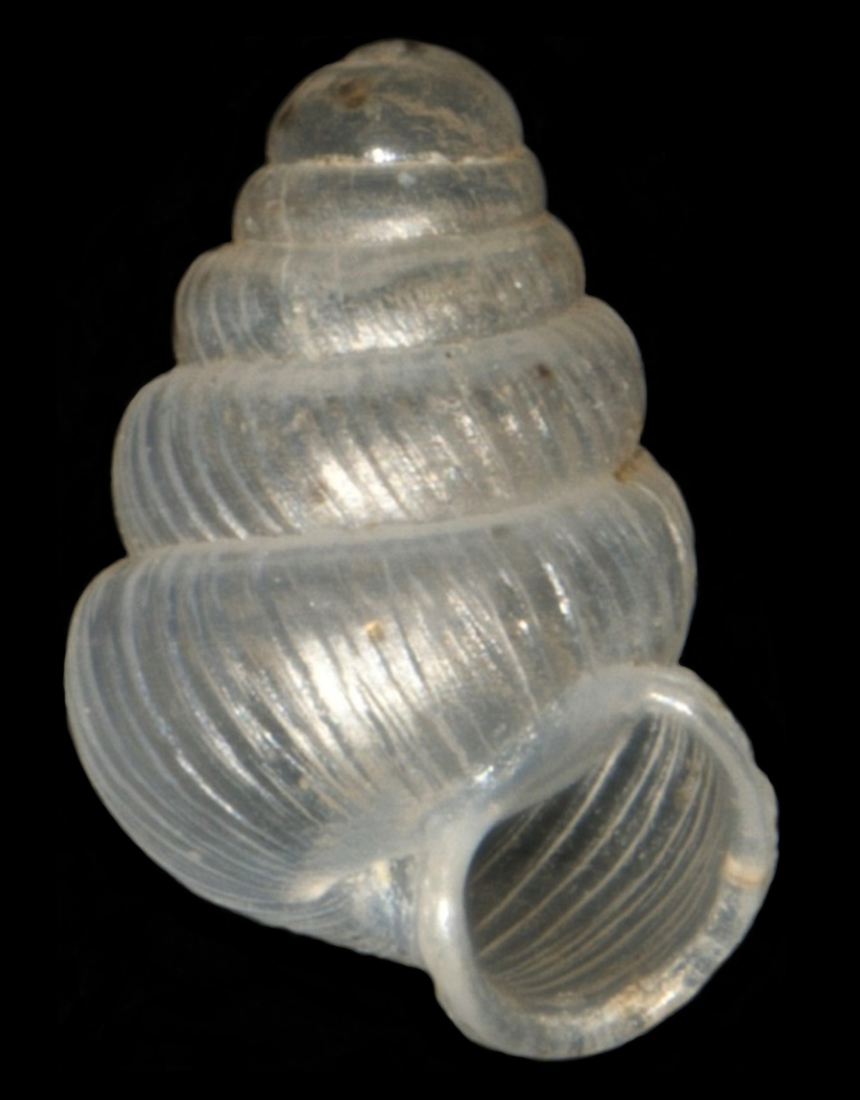
An empty shell of Zospeum percostulatum

- Callina waldeni Groh & De Mattia, 2018
- Georissa anyiensis Khalik, Hendriks, Vermeulen & Schilthuizen, 2018
- Georissa bauensis Khalik, Hendriks, Vermeulen & Schilthuizen, 2018
- Georissa kinabatanganensis Khalik, Hendriks, Vermeulen & Schilthuizen, 2018
- Georissa muluensis Khalik, Hendriks, Vermeulen & Schilthuizen, 2018
- Georissa sepulutensis Khalik, Hendriks, Vermeulen & Schilthuizen, 2018
- Georissa silaburensis Khalik, Hendriks, Vermeulen & Schilthuizen, 2018
- Hystricella microcarinata De Mattia & Groh, 2018
- Libera kondoi Christensen, Khan & Kirch, 2018
- Minidonta opunohua Christensen, Khan & Kirch, 2018
- Nesodiscus cookei Christensen, Khan & Kirch, 2018
- Nesodiscus nummus Christensen, Khan & Kirch, 2018
- Pilsbrylia dalli Simone, 2018
- Wollastonia beckmanni De Mattia & Groh, 2018
- Wollastonia falknerorum Groh, Neighbor & De Mattia, 2018
- Wollastonia inexpectata De Mattia & Groh, 2018
- Wollastonia jessicae De Mattia, Neighbor & Groh, 2018
- Wollastonia klausgrohi De Mattia & Neighbor, 2018
- Wollastonia ripkeni De Mattia & Groh, 2018
- Zospeum percostulatum Alonso, Prieto, Quiñonero-Salgado & Rolán, 2018

=== New subspecies ===
- Wollastonia jessicae jessicae De Mattia, Neighbor & Groh, 2018
- Wollastonia jessicae monticola De Mattia, Neighbor & Groh, 2018

=== New genera ===
- Wollastonia De Mattia, Neighbor & Groh, 2018

== See also ==
- List of gastropods described in 2017
- List of gastropods described in 2019
