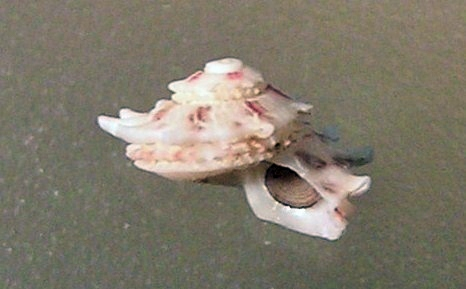
- Shell and operculum of Arene cruentata

Scientific classification
- Kingdom: Animalia
- Phylum: Mollusca
- Class: Gastropoda
- Subclass: Vetigastropoda
- Order: Trochida
- Family: Areneidae
- Genus: Arene; H. Adams & A. Adams, 1854

Type species
- Turbo cruentatus Megerle von Mühlfeld, 1824

Species
- See text

Synonyms
- Arene (Marevalvata) Olsson & Harbison, 1953; Liotia (Arene) H. Adams & A. Adams, 1854; Marevalvata Olsson & Harbison, 1953

= Arene (gastropod) =

Genus of gastropods

Arene is a genus of small sea snails that have a calcareous operculum, marine gastropod molluscs in the family Areneidae.

== Taxonomy ==
The genus Arene (and also the genus Cinysca) are placed within the family Areneidae, although Areneidae was not officially described as a taxon name. Areneidae was provisionally placed within the superfamily Angarioidea, according to Williams et al. (2008). It now belongs to the superfamily Trochoidea.

== Characteristics ==
(Original description) The shell is radially patterned with red pigmentation. The whorls are muricated (sculpted with sharp, pointed processes or scales). The body whorl is either stellate (star-like) at the periphery or possesses a strong peripheral keel and angulation. The peristome (the edge of the aperture) is characterized by one or more varixes (thickened ridges), rendering it more or less varicose.

== Species ==
Species within the genus Arene include:

- Arene adusta McLean, 1970
- Arene alta Rubio & Rolán, 2018
- Arene bairdii (W. H. Dall, 1889)
- Arene balboai (Strong & Hertlein, 1939)
- Arene bitleri Olsson & McGinty, 1958
- Arene boucheti Leal, 1991
- Arene brasiliana (W. H. Dall, 1927)
- Arene briarea (W. H. Dall, 1881)
- Arene carinata Carpenter, 1857
- Arene centrifuga (W. H. Dall, 1896)
- Arene cruentata (Mühlfeld, 1824)
- Arene curacoana Pilsbry, 1934
- Arene descensa Rubio & Rolán, 2018
- Arene echinacantha (Melvill & Standen, 1903)
- Arene echinata McLean, 1970
- Arene ferruginosa J. H. McLean, 1970
- Arene flexispina Leal & Coelho, 1985
- Arene fricki Crosse, 1865
- Arene guttata McLean, 1970
- Arene guyanensis Rubio & Rolán, 2018
- Arene hindsiana Pilsbry & Lowe, 1932
- † Arene jakobseni Hansen, 2019
- Arene laguairana Weisbord, 1962
- Arene lurida (W. H. Dall, 1913)
- Arene lychee Cavallari & Simone, 2018
- † Arene metaltilana Ladd, 1966
- Arene microforis (W. H. Dall, 1889)
- Arene miniata (W. H. Dall, 1889)
- Arene notialis Marini, 1975
- Arene olivacea (W. H. Dall, 1918)
- Arene pulex Faber, 2009
- Arene riisei Rehder, 1943
- Arene socorroensis (Strong, 1934)
- Arene stellata J. H. McLean, 1970
- † Arene stephensoni Schremp, 1981 (synonym: Liotia (Arene) machapoorieensis Mansfield, 1925)
- Arene tamsii (Philippi, 1852)
- Arene tricarinata (Stearns, 1872)
- Arene variabilis (W. H. Dall, 1889)
- Arene venusta (Woodring, 1928)
- Arene venustula Aguayo & Rehder, 1936

Other species include:

- Arene californica (W. H. Dall, 1908): synonym of Macrarene californica (W. H. Dall, 1908)
- Arene coronadensis (Stohler, 1959): synonym of Macrarene cookeana (Dall, 1918)
- Arene diegensis J. H. McLean, 1964
- Arene farallonensis (A. G. Smith, 1952): synonym of Macrarene farallonensis (A. G. Smith, 1952)
- Arene lepidotera (J. H. Mclean, 1970): synonym of Macrarene lepidotera J. H. McLean, 1970
- Arene pacis (Dall, 1908): synonym of Macrarene californica californica (Dall, 1908)

== Synonyms ==
- Arene lucasensis (A. M. Strong, 1934) : synonym of Haplocochlias lucasensis (A. M. Strong, 1934)
- Arene tamsiana [sic] : synonym of Arene tamsii (R. A. Philippi, 1852) (misspelling - incorrect subsequent spelling)
- Arene vanhyningi Rehder, 1943 : synonym of Arene cruentata (Megerle von Mühlfeld, 1824)
- Arene winslowae Pilsbry & H. N. Lowe, 1932 : synonym of Arene olivacea (Dall, 1918) (junior subjective synonym)
