= Canopus Bank =

Seamount in the South Atlantic Ocean

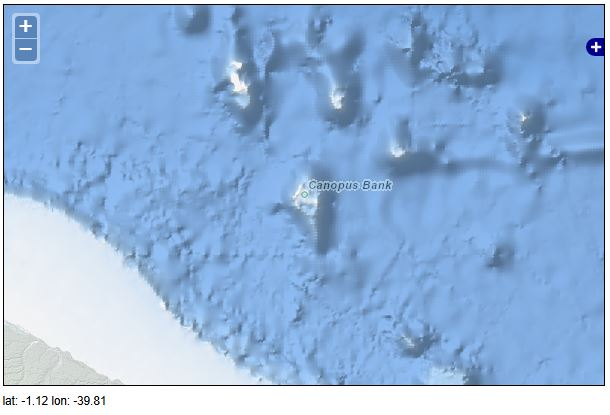
Map showing the location of Canopus Bank off northeastern Brazil

Canopus Bank is a submarine elevation located in the South Atlantic Ocean, off the coast of the state of Ceará, in Northeastern Brazil, at approximately 2°10′ S and 38°20′ W. It lies about 190 km northeast of the city of Fortaleza and is part of the Brazilian Equatorial Continental Margin, specifically within the Ceará Guyot. This bank is classified as a seamount, with significant geological, ecological, and biological relevance.

== Geology ==
Canopus Bank is characterized by an elongated morphology and a flattened summit, with gentle slopes. Bathymetric and seismic surveys reveal a structure developed in a region marked by normal faulting and post-rift thermal subsidence, typical of passive Atlantic margins formed after the South American-African continental breakup during the Cretaceous period.

Geophysical data show that the bank is composed of igneous rocks, both intrusive and extrusive, overlain by biogenic carbonate sediments formed by marine organism remains and coralline deposits. There is also evidence of volcanic activity linked to regional tectonic processes. The gradual subsidence created favorable conditions for the development of mesophotic reef environments.

== Biodiversity ==
Canopus Bank is considered a marine biodiversity hotspot, hosting a rich and diverse benthic fauna, including several rare and potentially endemic species.

=== Brachiopods ===
Three brachiopod species were identified at the bank:

- Tichosina martinicensis (Terebratulidae)
- Terebratulina cailleti (Cancellothyrididae)
- Argyrotheca sp. (Megathyrididae)

Some of these species were previously known only from other parts of the Atlantic, had their distributions greatly extended by the findings at Canopus Bank.

=== Crustaceans ===
The decapod fauna includes species such as Euprognatha limatula, a spider crab described from specimens collected at the bank.

=== Mollusks ===
Several species of gastropod mollusks have been described from specimens collected at Canopus Bank, including:

- Arene lychee
- Calliostoma melliferum
- Fasciolaria agatha
- Hipponix climax
- Lucapina elisae
- Nassarius levis
- Pedicularia tibia
