= Macrarene diegensis =

Scientific classification
- Kingdom: Animalia
- Phylum: Mollusca
- Class: Gastropoda
- Subclass: Vetigastropoda
- Order: Trochida
- Superfamily: Trochoidea
- Family: Liotiidae
- Genus: Macrarene
- Species: M. diegensis

Binomial name
- Macrarene diegensis McLean, 1964

Extinct species of gastropod

Macrarene diegensis is a fossil species of small sea snail, a marine gastropod mollusk in the family Liotiidae.

== Description ==
The height of the shell attains 20 mm, its diameter 25 mm. The narrowly umbilicated shell contains 4 whorls with distinct sutures and a projecting peripheral keel. The oblique aperture is circular. Its color is chalky white. This fossil species shows some similarities with Macrarene coronadoensis and Macrarene californica.

== Distribution ==
This species is known only as a fossil. It is found in the San Diego Formation, California, and dates from the Pliocene.
