= Arene microforis =

Scientific classification
- Kingdom: Animalia
- Phylum: Mollusca
- Class: Gastropoda
- Subclass: Vetigastropoda
- Order: Trochida
- Family: Areneidae
- Genus: Arene
- Species: A. microforis

Binomial name
- Arene microforis (Dall, 1889)

Synonyms
- Liotia (Arene) variabilis var. microforis Dall, 1889 (basionym)

Species of gastropod

Arene microforis is a species of sea snail, a marine gastropod mollusc in the family Areneidae.

== Description ==
The shell can grow to be 4 mm to 7 mm in length.

(Original description) The shell is characterized by radiating undulations (axial folds) that granulate (make rough or nodular) the underlying basal sculpture (spiral cords on the lower whorl). The body whorl is compactly coiled, resulting in the umbilicus being nearly or entirely closed. All these make it different from Liotia (Arene) variabilis Dall, 1889 (synonym of Arene variabilis (Dall, 1889))

== Distribution ==
Arene microforis can be found from Yucatán, Mexico to East Brazil.
