= M. digitata =

M. digitata may refer to:

- Macrarene digitata, a sea snail, a marine gastropod mollusk in the family Liotiidae
- Merulempista digitata, a moth species found in China
- Montipora digitata, the finger coral, a stony coral species found in East Africa, the Indo-West Pacific, Kenya, Mozambique and Rodriguez

== Synonyms ==
- Monilia digitata or Mucor digitata, two synonyms for Penicillium digitatum, a plant pathogen
