= Arene adusta =

Scientific classification
- Kingdom: Animalia
- Phylum: Mollusca
- Class: Gastropoda
- Subclass: Vetigastropoda
- Order: Trochida
- Superfamily: Trochoidea
- Family: Areneidae
- Genus: Arene
- Species: A. adusta

Binomial name
- Arene adusta J. H. McLean, 1970

Species of gastropod

Arene adusta is a species of sea snail, a marine gastropod mollusk in the family Areneidae.

== Description ==
The shell can grow up to be 5 mm in length.

== Distribution ==
Arene adusta can be found from Baja California to Panama.
