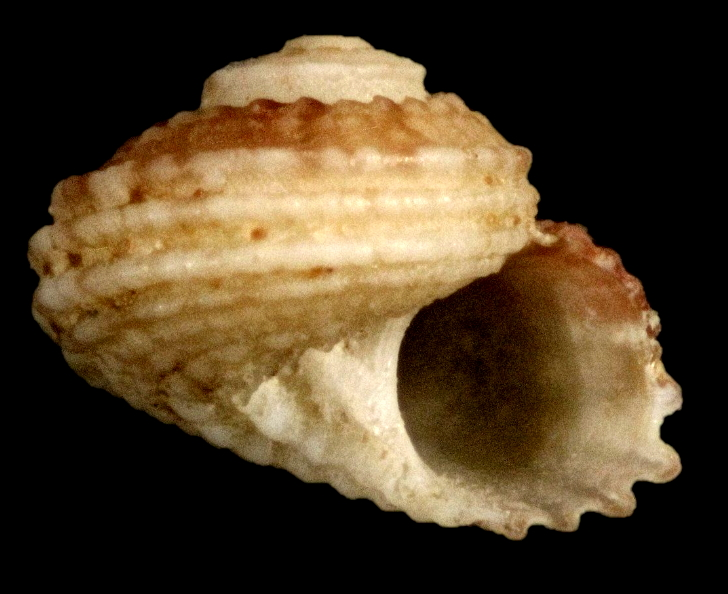
- Shell of Arene socorroensis (specimen at Naturalis Biodiversity Center)

Scientific classification
- Kingdom: Animalia
- Phylum: Mollusca
- Class: Gastropoda
- Subclass: Vetigastropoda
- Order: Trochida
- Superfamily: Trochoidea
- Family: Areneidae
- Genus: Arene
- Species: A. socorroensis

Binomial name
- Arene socorroensis (Strong, 1934)

Synonyms
- Liotia socorroensis Strong, 1934

= Arene socorroensis =

Species of gastropod

Arene socorroensis is a species of sea snail, a marine gastropod mollusk in the family Areneidae.

== Description ==
The height of the shell attains 5 mm, its diameter 6 mm. The teleoconch contains 4 whorls, the protoconch about one whorl. The spiral cords are strong. The axial ribs are faint or absent. The body whorl contains about 8 unequal spiral cords.

== Distribution ==
This marine species occurs off Socorro Island in the intertidal zone.
