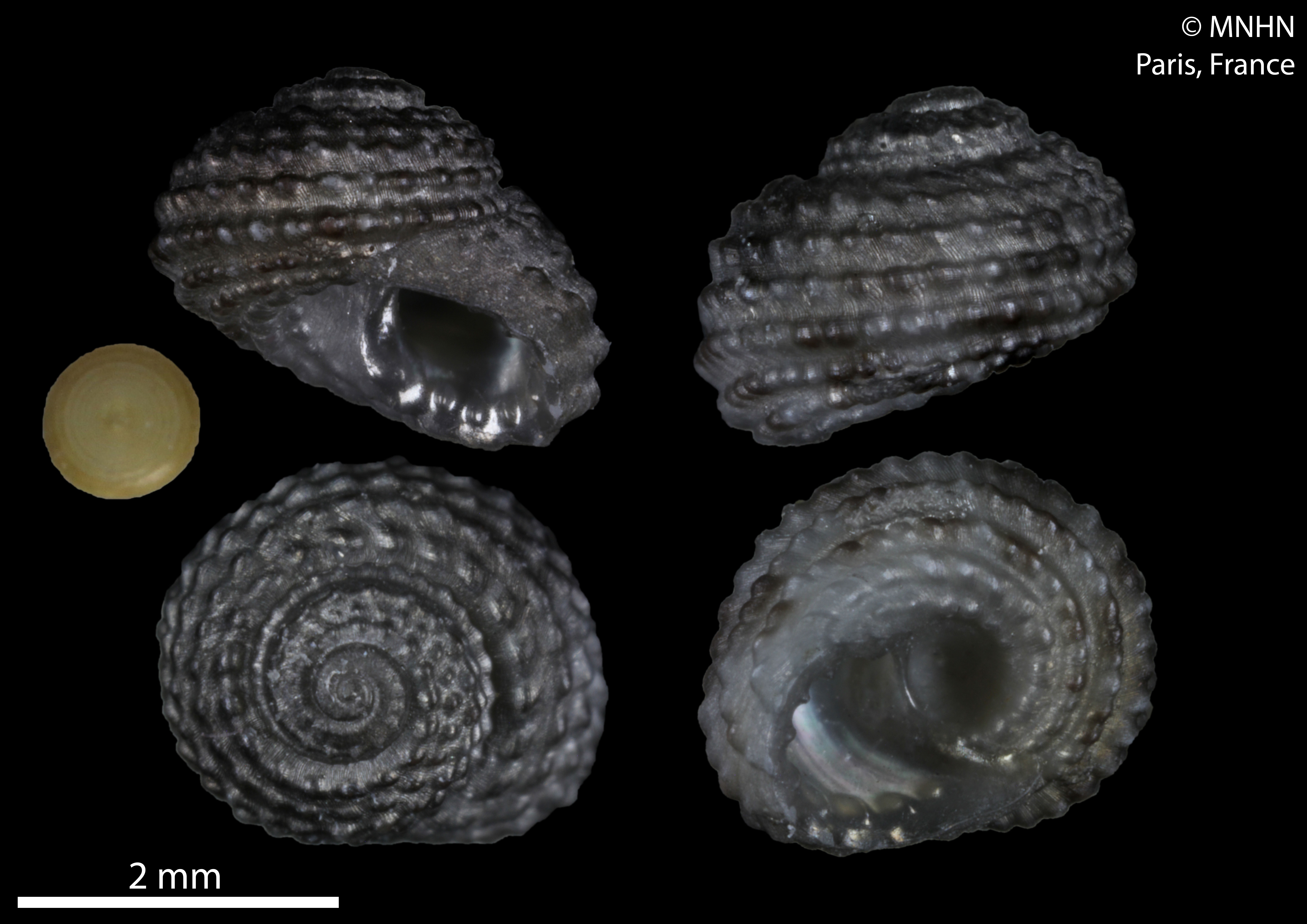

Scientific classification
- Kingdom: Animalia
- Phylum: Mollusca
- Class: Gastropoda
- Subclass: Vetigastropoda
- Order: Trochida
- Superfamily: Trochoidea
- Family: Areneidae
- Genus: Arene
- Species: A. boucheti

Binomial name
- Arene boucheti Leal, 1991

= Arene boucheti =

Species of gastropod

Arene boucheti is a species of sea snail, a marine gastropod mollusk in the family Areneidae.

== Description ==
The shell can grow to be 3 mm to 7 mm in length.

== Distribution ==
Arene boucheti can be found off of East Brazil.
