= Macrarene =

Scientific classification
- Kingdom: Animalia
- Phylum: Mollusca
- Class: Gastropoda
- Subclass: Vetigastropoda
- Order: Trochida
- Superfamily: Trochoidea
- Family: Liotiidae
- Genus: Macrarene; Hertlein & Strong, 1951

Type species
- Liotia californica Dall 1908

Genus of gastropods

Macrarene is a genus of small sea snails, marine gastropod mollusks in the family Liotiidae within the superfamily Trochoidea, the top snails, turban snails and their allies.

== Description ==
The white shells have a turbinate shape and a broad umbilicus. They are characterized by axial ribs and spiral cords, that form spines at their intersections. The lip is not thickened at maturity. It differs from the closely related genus Arene through its lack of shell pigments and in the spacing of the axial sculpture.

== Species ==
Species within the genus Macrarene include:

- Macrarene californica (Dall, 1908)
- Macrarene cookeana (Dall, 1918)
- Macrarene coronadoensis Stohler, 1959
- Macrarene diegensis McLean 1964
- Macrarene digitata McLean, Absalao & Santos Cruz, 1988
- Macrarene farallonensis (A. G. Smith, 1952)
- Macrarene lepidotera McLean, 1970
- Macrarene spectabilospina Shasky, 1970
