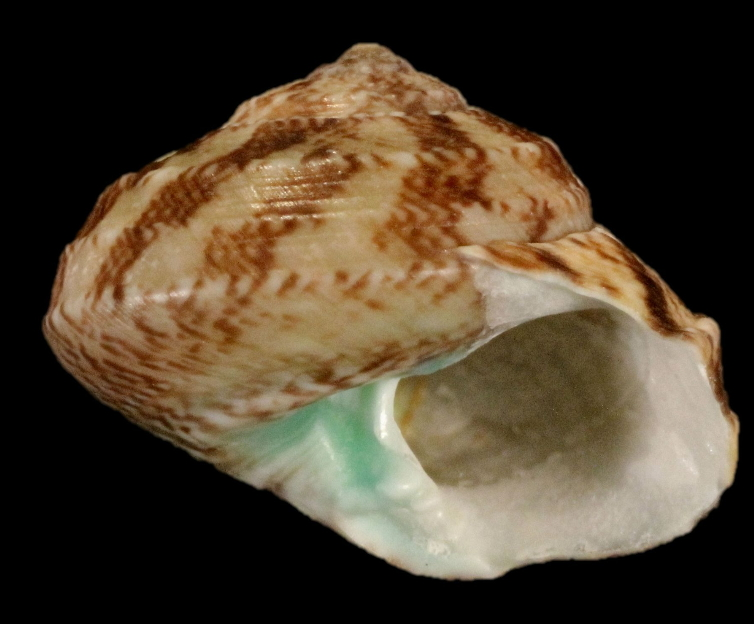
- Shell of Arene fricki (specimen at Naturalis Biodiversity Center)

Scientific classification
- Kingdom: Animalia
- Phylum: Mollusca
- Class: Gastropoda
- Subclass: Vetigastropoda
- Order: Trochida
- Superfamily: Trochoidea
- Family: Areneidae
- Genus: Arene
- Species: A. fricki

Binomial name
- Arene fricki (Crosse, 1865)

Synonyms
- Collonia fricki Crosse, 1865 (original combination); Liotia rammata Dall, 1918 junior subjective synonym

= Arene fricki =

Species of gastropod

Arene fricki is a species of sea snail, a marine gastropod mollusk in the family Areneidae.

The species was first described by Crosse in 1865. It belongs to the genus Arene, which comprises small, top-shaped sea snails with distinctive shell features.

== Description ==
The shell can grow to be 3mm to 5 mm in length, its diameter 5.5 mm. The shell of Arene fricki is small and trochiform (top-shaped), typical for the genus. The shell generally displays pronounced spiral and axial sculpturing, providing a textured surface. Coloration tends to be pale or muted, sometimes with subtle patterns. The species has a calcareous operculum, a feature consistent with other members of its genus.

(Original description in Latin) The shell is narrowly umbilicate, depressed-turbinate (low top-shaped), and shaped like a Angaria(Röding, 1798) or ram's horn shell. It is rather thick and colored whitish, variegated (mottled) to a greater or lesser degree with black.

The shell has four post-nuclear whorls that increase rapidly in size. The 1½ whorls of the protoconch are smooth and whitish. The sides of the whorls are sub-flat near the suture and more convex below.

The sculpture consists of very fine spiral striae and two strong ribs that form a keel, girdling the shell. The suture is sub-crenulated (minutely notched). The body whorl is tricostate-carinate (bearing three ribs that form keels). These ribs are often more or less articulated (jointed or patterned) with black and white. The whorl descends slightly toward the aperture.

The base is flatly convex and is sculptured with spiral, granulate striae. The aperture is rounded and white, but not pearly (non-nacreous) internally. The outer lip is strongly thickened.

== Distribution ==
Arene fricki can be found from Pacific Mexico to Panama.
