= Cinysca granulata =

Scientific classification
- Kingdom: Animalia
- Phylum: Mollusca
- Class: Gastropoda
- Subclass: Vetigastropoda
- Order: Trochida
- Superfamily: Trochoidea
- Family: Areneidae
- Genus: Cinysca
- Species: C. granulata

Binomial name
- Cinysca granulata (A. Adams, 1853)

Synonyms
- Cyclostrema (Cynisca) granulatum A. Adams, 1854 ·; Cyclostrema granulatum A. Adams, 1853

Species of gastropod

Cinysca granulata is a species of sea snail, a marine gastropod mollusk in the family Areneidae.

This is a nomen nudum.

== Distribution ==
This marine species occurs off the Philippines.
