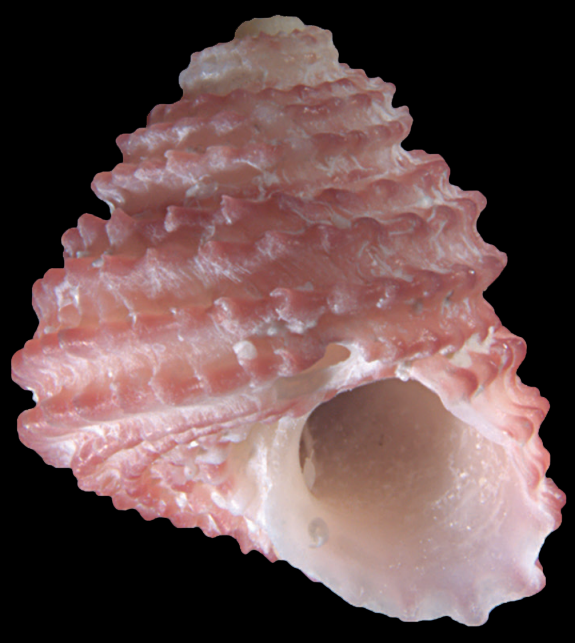
- Apertural view of the holotype of Arene lychee

Scientific classification
- Kingdom: Animalia
- Phylum: Mollusca
- Class: Gastropoda
- Subclass: Vetigastropoda
- Order: Trochida
- Superfamily: Trochoidea
- Family: Areneidae
- Genus: Arene
- Species: A. lychee

Binomial name
- Arene lychee Cavallari & Simone, 2018

= Arene lychee =

Species of gastropod

Arene lychee is a species of marine gastropod mollusk in the family Areneidae.

It was described in 2018 based on specimens collected from Canopus Bank, a seamount located approximately 190 km off the coast of Fortaleza, Ceará, Brazil. The species was named for its striking resemblance to the lychee fruit Litchi chinensis, with its spherical shape, spiny projections, and yellow-tipped apex similar to the fruit's appearance.

The shell of A. lychee is relatively large for the genus reaching 7–9 mm in height, slightly taller than wide. It displays vivid coloration ranging from deep red to white, and features 3 to 8 prominent spiral cords adorned with hollow spine-like scales. These cords are separated by deep grooves marked by fine, compact axial growth lines. The aperture is rounded and pinkish-white, and the base is convex with additional spiral cords and a shallow, narrow umbilicus. As the original description was based on empty shells, the operculum remains unknown.

Arene lychee is known only from its type locality, Canopus Bank, which hosts a highly diverse invertebrate fauna, including many endemic species. It inhabits deep-water coral reef environments at depths of 200 to 260 meters, where the substrate is primarily biogenic, composed of fragmented remains of corals, crustaceans, echinoderms, and mollusk shells.

== Taxonomy and etymology ==
Arene lychee belongs to the family Areneidae. Members of this family are known for their colorful and often intricately sculptured shells, which contrast with the generally duller appearance of shells from the closely related family Liotiidae. Typical features of the group include prominent spiral sculpture, a tangential aperture (the shell's opening) bearing denticles, and an outer lip that is preceded by a short whorl expansion. Within this family, species of the genus Arene, including A. lychee, are especially noted for their richly textured shells, although the degree of sculpture can vary significantly. Most species display multiple spiral cords or carinae around the shell's periphery. A common feature in the genus, clearly observed in A. lychee, is the presence of vaulted scales or tubercles on one or more of the major spiral cords.

The species name lychee was inspired by the visual similarity between the shell of this snail and the fruit of the lychee tree (Litchi chinensis). Like the fruit, the shell is roughly spherical and covered in spiky projections. The shell's yellow apex and overall coloration further corroborate this resemblance.

== Description ==
Arene lychee has a relatively large, trochiform (roughly cone-like) shell, with a height ranging from 7 to 9 mm. The shell is slightly taller than wide, with a vivid color pattern that ranges from intense red to white. The spiral cords on the shell are darker, and the base is lighter, with a yellow apex. The shell features 3 to 8 prominent spiral cords adorned with scale-like, hollow spines. These cords are separated by deep interspaces, which are sculpted with thin, closely packed axial growth lines. The aperture (the shell's opening) is rounded and pinkish-white. The shell's base is convex, with additional spiral cords and a narrow, shallow umbilicus. Since the original description was based on empty shells, the operculum of this species is unknown.

Among its relatives, the shell of Arene lychee is most similar to Arene briareus from the Caribbean Sea, sharing color patterns and size. However, A. lychee differs by having fewer spiral cords, larger, more pronounced spines, and a more pronounced trochiform shape with a straighter profile. It is also at least 25% larger than most other Brazilian Arene species, except for Arene flexispina, from which it can be distinguished by its overall red shell with a yellow apex, (as opposed to reddish-brown in A flexispina) and also by its more coarsely sculptured base.

== Distribution ==
This species is known only from its type locality, Canopus Bank, located approximately 190 km off the coast of Fortaleza, Ceará, Brazil. The species inhabits deep-sea coralline bottoms at depths of 200–260 meters. Canopus Bank is a seamount, a submerged mountain rising from the ocean floor, which harbors a highly diverse invertebrate fauna, including many endemic species. The substrate at Canopus is predominantly biogenic, consisting of calcareous particles from mixed animal remains such as fragmentary hard corals, crustaceans, echinoderms, and mollusk shells.
