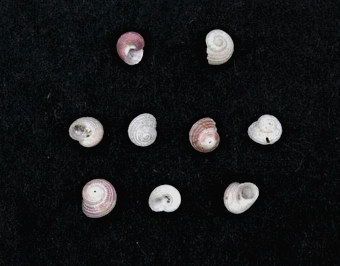
- Several shells of Cinysca dunkeri (museum specimens at Naturalis Biodiversity Center)

Scientific classification
- Kingdom: Animalia
- Phylum: Mollusca
- Class: Gastropoda
- Subclass: Vetigastropoda
- Order: Trochida
- Family: Areneidae
- Genus: Cinysca
- Species: C. dunkeri

Binomial name
- Cinysca dunkeri (Philippi, 1852)

Synonyms
- Cinysca granulosa (Dunker, 1848); Cynisca granulosa (Dunker, 1848); Delphinula dunkeri Philippi, 1853 (original combination); Delphinula granulosa Dunker, 1848 (invalid: junior homonym of Delphinula granulosa Grateloup, 1828; D. dunkeri is a replacement name)

= Cinysca dunkeri =

Species of gastropod

Cinysca dunkeri is a species of sea snail, a marine gastropod mollusk in the family Areneidae.

== Description ==
Cinysca dunkeri (Lüderitz-eastern Wild Coast) has a thick, rounded shell; uniformly pale on the west coast, speckled on the south coast. Umbilicus large and obvious. About eight strong, equal-sized ridges spiral around each whorl and corrugate the outer lip. Operculum horny and flexible, but has spiral rows of minute calcareous beads. Related to turban shells (Plate 78) although specifically resembling wrinkles.

== Distribution ==
Cinysca dunkeri can be found off of South Africa and Namibia.
