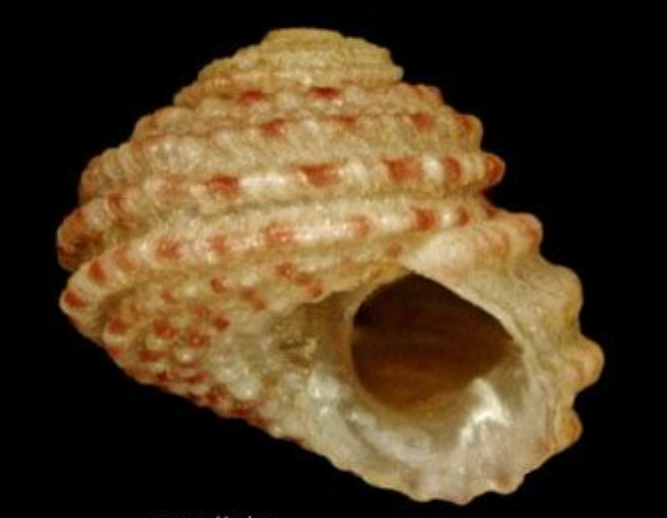
- Shell of Arene guttata (specimen at the Natural History Museum Rotterdam)

Scientific classification
- Kingdom: Animalia
- Phylum: Mollusca
- Class: Gastropoda
- Subclass: Vetigastropoda
- Order: Trochida
- Superfamily: Trochoidea
- Family: Areneidae
- Genus: Arene
- Species: A. guttata

Binomial name
- Arene guttata McLean, 1970

= Arene guttata =

Species of gastropod

Arene guttata is a species of sea snail, a marine gastropod mollusk in the family Areneidae.

== Description ==
The shell can grow to be 4 mm to 7.5 mm in length.

== Distribution ==
Arene guttata can be found off of the Galápagos Islands and the Cocos Island.
