= Arene balboai =

Scientific classification
- Kingdom: Animalia
- Phylum: Mollusca
- Class: Gastropoda
- Subclass: Vetigastropoda
- Order: Trochida
- Superfamily: Trochoidea
- Family: Areneidae
- Genus: Arene
- Species: A. balboai

Binomial name
- Arene balboai (Strong & Hertlein, 1939)

Synonyms
- Liotia balboai A. M. Strong & Hertlein, 1939

Species of gastropod

Arene balboai is a species of sea snail, a marine gastropod mollusk in the family Areneidae.

== Etymology ==
It is named after Nunez de Balboa.

== Description ==
The shell can grow to be 3 mm to 4.5 mm in length.

== Distribution ==
Arene Balboai can be found off of the Taboga Island and the Cocos Island.; also off Baja California, Mexico.
