= Arene stellata =

Scientific classification
- Kingdom: Animalia
- Phylum: Mollusca
- Class: Gastropoda
- Subclass: Vetigastropoda
- Order: Trochida
- Superfamily: Trochoidea
- Family: Areneidae
- Genus: Arene
- Species: A. stellata

Binomial name
- Arene stellata McLean, 1970

Species of gastropod

Arene stellata is a species of sea snail, a marine gastropod in the family Areneidae.

== Distribution ==
This species occurs off the Baja California, Mexico
