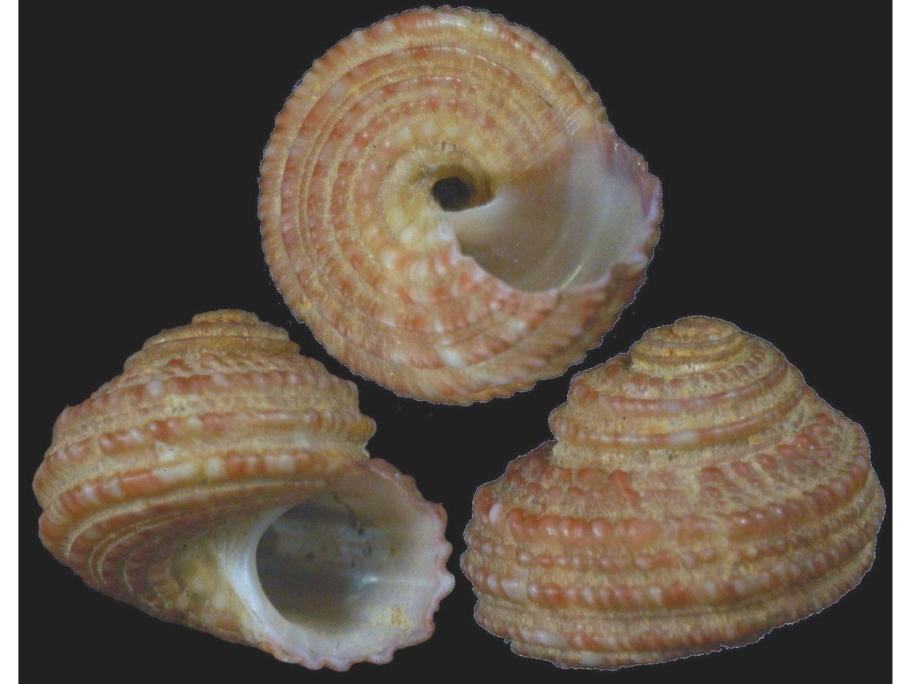
- Shell of Arene ferruginosa (holotype at the Natural History Museum of Los Angeles County)

Scientific classification
- Kingdom: Animalia
- Phylum: Mollusca
- Class: Gastropoda
- Subclass: Vetigastropoda
- Order: Trochida
- Superfamily: Trochoidea
- Family: Areneidae
- Genus: Arene
- Species: A. ferruginosa

Binomial name
- Arene ferruginosa McLean, 1970

= Arene ferruginosa =

Species of gastropod

Arene ferruginosa is a species of sea snail, a marine gastropod mollusk in the family Areneidae.

== Shell size ==
The Arene ferruginosa has an average shell size of approximately 7mm.

== Distribution ==
This species occurs in the Pacific Ocean off Mexico, Honduras, Costa Rica and Panama.
