= Arene pulex =

Scientific classification
- Kingdom: Animalia
- Phylum: Mollusca
- Class: Gastropoda
- Subclass: Vetigastropoda
- Order: Trochida
- Family: Areneidae
- Genus: Arene
- Species: A. pulex

Binomial name
- Arene pulex Faber, 2009

Species of gastropod

Arene pulex is a species of sea snail, a marine gastropod mollusc in the family Areneidae.

== Distribution ==
This species occurs in the Caribbean Sea off the ABC islands.
