= Cinysca arlequin =

Scientific classification
- Kingdom: Animalia
- Phylum: Mollusca
- Class: Gastropoda
- Subclass: Vetigastropoda
- Order: Trochida
- Family: Areneidae
- Genus: Cinysca
- Species: C. arlequin

Binomial name
- Cinysca arlequin Rubio & Rolan, 2002

Species of gastropod

Cinysca arlequin is a species of sea snail, a marine gastropod mollusk in the family Areneidae.
