= Arene notialis =

Scientific classification
- Kingdom: Animalia
- Phylum: Mollusca
- Class: Gastropoda
- Subclass: Vetigastropoda
- Order: Trochida
- Superfamily: Trochoidea
- Family: Areneidae
- Genus: Arene
- Species: A. notialis

Binomial name
- Arene notialis Marini, 1975

Species of gastropod

Arene notialis is a species of sea snail, a marine gastropod mollusc in the family Areneidae.

== Distribution ==
This marine species occurs off Brazil.
