= Cinysca bicarinata =

Scientific classification
- Kingdom: Animalia
- Phylum: Mollusca
- Class: Gastropoda
- Subclass: Vetigastropoda
- Order: Trochida
- Family: Areneidae
- Genus: Cinysca
- Species: C. bicarinata

Binomial name
- Cinysca bicarinata (E. von Martens, 1902)

Synonyms
- Cantrainea bicarinata (E. von Martens, 1902); Collonia bicarinata E. von Martens, 1902 (original combination); Liotia bicarinata (E. von Martens, 1902)

Species of gastropod

Cinysca bicarinata is a species of sea snail, a marine gastropod mollusk in the family Areneidae.

== Description ==
The length of the shell attains 9 mm, its diameter 6 mm.

(Original description in Latin) The shell is nearly round, somewhat solid, and umbilicated. It is yellowish-white and uniform in color, sculpted with two elevated spiral keels, otherwise smooth. The spire is short, conical, and stepped. The body whorl features a spiral ridge between the two keels and is adorned with two spiral ridges on the base.

Anteriorly, the body whorl is distinctly compressed and slightly expanded, with keels and ridges extending outward, giving it a slightly angular appearance. The outer margin is strongly curved and fairly thin, while the basal margin is thickened. The columellar margin remains thin and straight, not reflected into the umbilicus.

The underside is slightly concave, with two spiral ridges and a relatively large, angular umbilicus. The aperture is oblique and circular, with the peristome slightly expanded and adorned with outward-extending keels and ridges.

== Distribution ==
This marine species occurs off the Agulhas Bank, South Africa.
