= Arene carinata =

Scientific classification
- Kingdom: Animalia
- Phylum: Mollusca
- Class: Gastropoda
- Subclass: Vetigastropoda
- Order: Trochida
- Superfamily: Trochoidea
- Family: Areneidae
- Genus: Arene
- Species: A. carinata

Binomial name
- Arene carinata (P.P. Carpenter, 1857)

Synonyms
- Liotia carinata P. P. Carpenter, 1857 superseded combination

Species of gastropod

Arene carinata is a species of sea snail, a marine gastropod mollusk in the family Areneidae.

== Description ==
(Original description in Latin) The shell is solid and robust, exhibiting a grayish (cinereous) hue often tinged with red.

The shell consists of four whorls with a depressed spire. The superior whorl surfaces are sub-flattened, separated by a distinct and angulated suture. The body whorl is strikingly decumbent, descending sharply toward the base.

The sculpture is defined by sharp keels and ridges. The spire is traversed by three nodulose spiral lirae. The periphery is armored by four prominent, projecting keels (carinae). The rounded base carries an additional three non-projecting spiral ridges. A particularly notable feature is the large umbilicus, which is surrounded by a surface marked with rough, radiately (axially) oriented nodules.

The aperture is internally circular and barely achieves contact with the penultimate whorl.

== Distribution ==
This species occurs in the Pacific Ocean off California, USA and Mexico.
