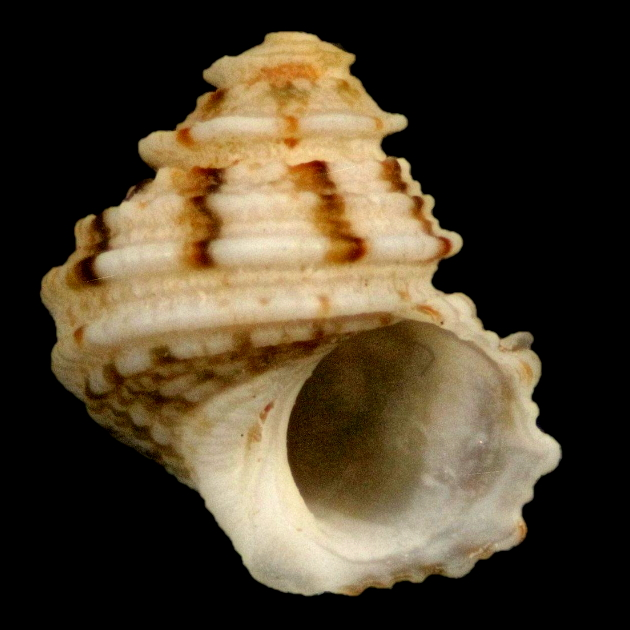
- Shell of Arene venustula (specimen at Naturalis Biodiversity Center)

Scientific classification
- Kingdom: Animalia
- Phylum: Mollusca
- Class: Gastropoda
- Subclass: Vetigastropoda
- Order: Trochida
- Family: Areneidae
- Genus: Arene
- Species: A. venustula

Binomial name
- Arene venustula Aguayo & Rehder, 1936

= Arene venustula =

Species of gastropod

Arene venustula is a species of small sea snail, a marine gastropod mollusk in the family Areneidae.

== Description ==
The shell can grow to be 8.2 mm in length.

== Distribution ==
Arene venustula can be found from East Florida to Cuba.
