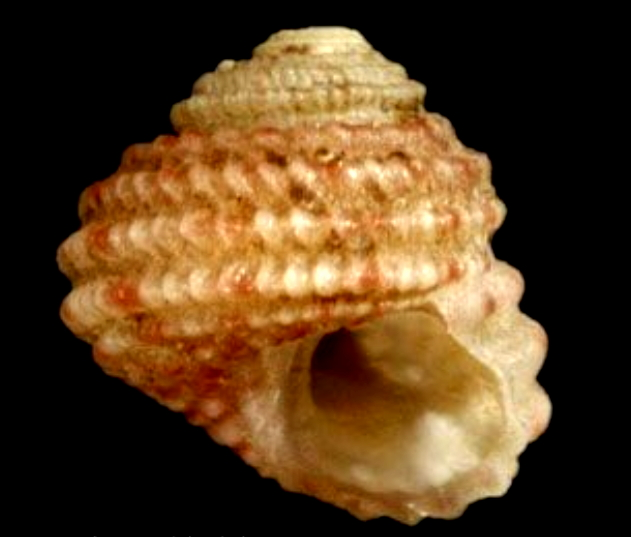
- Shell of Arene hindsiana (specimen at the Natural History Museum Rotterdam)

Scientific classification
- Kingdom: Animalia
- Phylum: Mollusca
- Class: Gastropoda
- Subclass: Vetigastropoda
- Order: Trochida
- Superfamily: Trochoidea
- Family: Areneidae
- Genus: Arene
- Species: A. hindsiana

Binomial name
- Arene hindsiana Pilsbry & Lowe, 1932

= Arene hindsiana =

Species of gastropod

Arene hindsiana is a species of sea snail, a marine gastropod mollusk in the family Areneidae.

== Description ==
The shell can grow to be 3 mm to 5.3 mm in length.

== Distribution ==
This species occurs in the Pacific Ocean off Mexico, Costa Rica and Panama.
