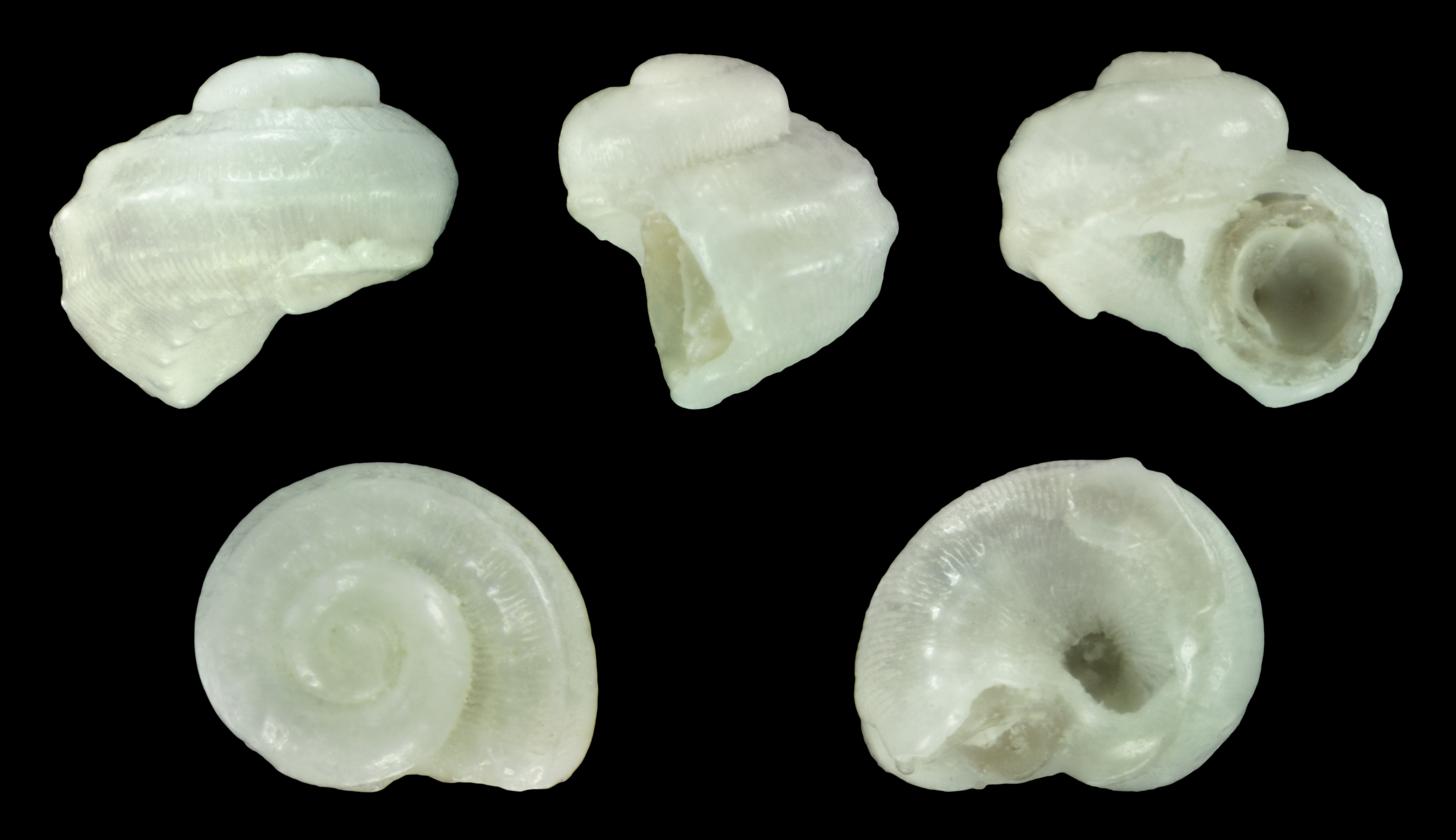

Scientific classification
- Kingdom: Animalia
- Phylum: Mollusca
- Class: Gastropoda
- Subclass: Vetigastropoda
- Order: Trochida
- Superfamily: Trochoidea
- Family: Areneidae
- Genus: Arene
- Species: A. miniata

Binomial name
- Arene miniata (Dall, 1889)

Synonyms
- Liotia (Arene) miniata Dall, 1889

= Arene miniata =

Species of gastropod

Arene miniata is a species of sea snail, a marine gastropod mollusc in the family Areneidae.

== Description ==
(Original description) The shell is minute and white, ornamented with streaks of pale brown, or with dots and radiating blotches of bright rose-color.

The shell consists of approximately three whorls, including the protoconch. The entire surface is finely shagreen (covered in a granular texture). The shell lacks defined radiating sculpture, possessing only incremental growth lines. The suture is distinct but not noticeably channeled.

The spiral sculpture is the most prominent feature and is strongly differentiated. One small, generally minutely nodulous spiral rib is present at the suture. Two strong, non-nodulous spirals define the periphery, with one located near the periphery and the other exactly at the periphery. The wide umbilicus is bordered by two or three very strong, evenly noduled spirals. The outermost of these forms the umbilical carina (edge), with the others ascending steeply inside the umbilicus. All main spirals are separated by very deep channels. Fainter, intermediate spirals may occasionally appear on the outer surface.

The aperture is circular and becomes slightly varicose (thickened) in the adult. The operculum is multispiral, primarily calcareous, concave, and features a central perforation when weathered.

== Distribution ==
This species occurs in the Caribbean Sea.
