= Arene laguairana =

Scientific classification
- Kingdom: Animalia
- Phylum: Mollusca
- Class: Gastropoda
- Subclass: Vetigastropoda
- Order: Trochida
- Superfamily: Trochoidea
- Family: Areneidae
- Genus: Arene
- Species: A. laguairana

Binomial name
- Arene laguairana Weisbord, 1962

Synonyms
- Arene (Marevalvata) laguairana Weisbord, 1962 · alternative representation

Species of gastropod

Arene laguairana is a species of sea snail, a marine gastropod mollusk in the family Areneidae.

== Distribution ==
This marine species occurs off Venezuela.
