= Arene curacoana =

Scientific classification
- Kingdom: Animalia
- Phylum: Mollusca
- Class: Gastropoda
- Subclass: Vetigastropoda
- Order: Trochida
- Superfamily: Trochoidea
- Family: Areneidae
- Genus: Arene
- Species: A. curacoana

Binomial name
- Arene curacoana Pilsbry, 1934

Species of gastropod

Arene curacoana is a species of sea snail, a marine gastropod mollusk in the family Areneidae.

== Description ==
The shell can grow to be 3.4 mm in length.

== Distribution ==
Arene curacoana can be found off of Curaçao, Bonair, and Saint Vincent.
