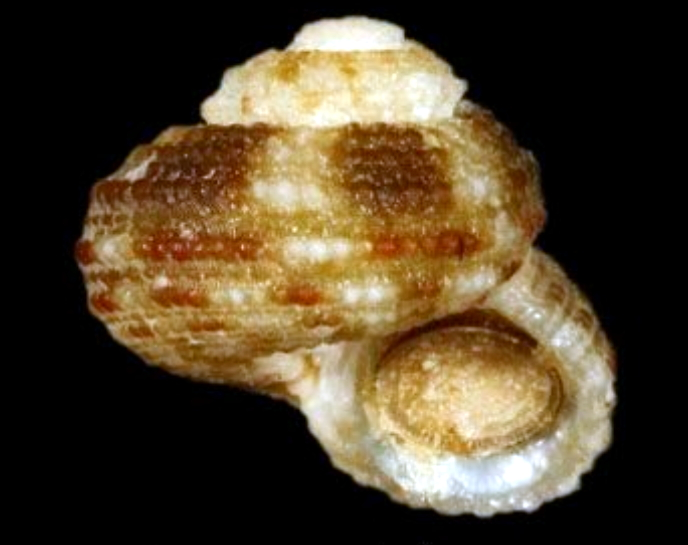
- Shell of Arene brasiliana (specimen at the Natural History Museum, Rotterdam)

Scientific classification
- Kingdom: Animalia
- Phylum: Mollusca
- Class: Gastropoda
- Subclass: Vetigastropoda
- Order: Trochida
- Superfamily: Trochoidea
- Family: Areneidae
- Genus: Arene
- Species: A. brasiliana

Binomial name
- Arene brasiliana (Dall, 1927)

Synonyms
- Liotia brasiliana Dall, 1927

= Arene brasiliana =

Species of gastropod

Arene brasiliana is a species of sea snail, a marine gastropod mollusk in the family Areneidae.

== Description ==
The shell can grow to be 7 mm in length.

The species' small, solid, white shell features radiating rose-pink blotches and approximately four whorls, the earlier of which are subtabulate. The suture is closely appressed. The minute protoconch is smooth. Spiral sculpture consists of three prominent crenulated cords on the body whorl's periphery, with a smaller thread in the interspaces, and three or four minor threads between the suture and the posterior major cord. On the base, the deep, narrow umbilicus has a coarsely crenulate margin and four equal crenulate minor threads between it and the anterior peripheral cord. The aperture is circular with a thickened peristome, somewhat crenulated by the external sculpture. Very fine incremental lines give the interstices a velvety appearance.

== Distribution ==
Arene brasiliana can be found from Panama to North Brazil. in climates of tropical to subtropical. The species is demersal, with a depth range from 10 to 81 meters at 9°N - 21°S, 82°E - 29°E.

== Life cycle ==
The species is a mostly gonochoric and broadcast spawner. The embryos develop into planktonic trocophore larvae and later into juvenile veligers before becoming fully grown adults.
