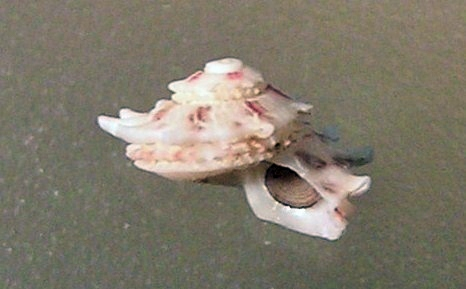
- Lateral view of shell and operculum of Arene cruentata

Scientific classification
- Kingdom: Animalia
- Phylum: Mollusca
- Class: Gastropoda
- Subclass: Vetigastropoda
- Order: Trochida
- Family: Areneidae
- Genus: Arene
- Species: A. cruentata

Binomial name
- Arene cruentata (Mühlfeld, 1824)

Synonyms
- Arene vanhyningi Rehder, 1943; Trochus cruentatus Mühlfeld, 1824

= Arene cruentata =

Species of gastropod

Arene cruentata is a species of small sea snail, a marine gastropod mollusc in the family Areneidae.

== Description ==
The shell can grow to be 6 mm to 16.5 mm in length.

(Described as Arene vanhyningi) This shell is of medium size for the genus, characterized by its depressed-conical shape and four remaining whorls (the nuclear whorls are missing). The upper surface is a yellowish gray, contrasting with the stout, stellate peripheral keel, which is white. The underside (base) of the shell is generally grayish white.

The early whorls show some axially directed rose spots, which transition to straw brown and become much smaller on later whorls.

The shell features a conspicuous sutural canal and complex ornamentation:

The upper surface is obscurely axially rugose (wrinkled). These low, broad axial folds often form knobs right at the edge of the sutural channel. The channels between the keels are generally sculptured with fine axial threads. The periphery is defined by three prominent features that give the shell an Astraea Röding, 1798-like appearance. An acute keel is present at the periphery, bearing large, regular, triangular spines. These spines are hollow on the anterior side and increase in size toward the aperture. Just below this main keel is a narrow spiral cord with regular, small, low, anteriorly hollow scales. Below the middle cord is a minutely serrate keel.

The base is flattened below the lowest peripheral keel. The base proper is sculptured with four low, beaded cords. The narrow, deep umbilicus is entered by two broad cords.

The aperture is circular and slightly expanded, with an externally thickened lip. The interior displays a yellowish pearly luster. The operculum is multispiral, concave, and typical for the group, with its whorls ornamented by crowded, radially elongated, calcareous beads.

== Distribution ==
This species occurs in Florida, the Gulf of Mexico and the Caribbean Sea.

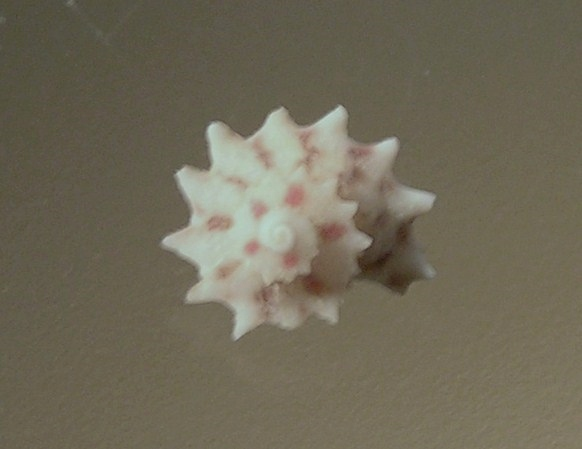
Apical view of shell

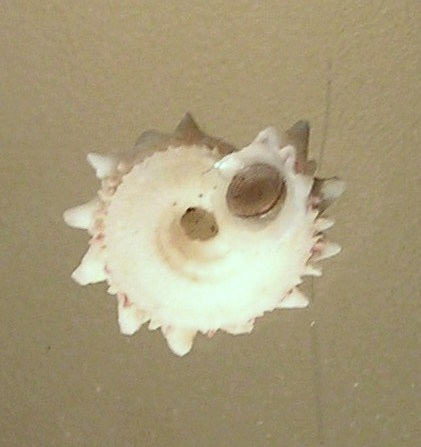
Umbilical view of shell, also showing operculum
