= Arene stephensoni =

Scientific classification
- Kingdom: Animalia
- Phylum: Mollusca
- Class: Gastropoda
- Subclass: Vetigastropoda
- Order: Trochida
- Superfamily: Trochoidea
- Family: Areneidae
- Genus: Arene
- Species: †A. stephensoni

Binomial name
- †Arene stephensoni Schremp, 1981

Synonyms
- Liotia (Arene) machapoorieensis (Mansfield, 1925)

Species of gastropod

Arene stephensoni is a species of extinct sea snail, a marine gastropod mollusc in the family Areneidae.

== See also ==
- List of species in the genus Arene
