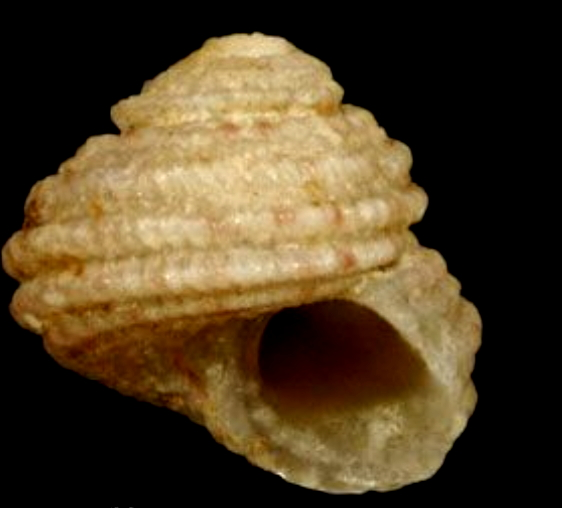
- Shell of Arene olivacea (specimen at the Natural History Museum Rotterdam)

Scientific classification
- Kingdom: Animalia
- Phylum: Mollusca
- Class: Gastropoda
- Subclass: Vetigastropoda
- Order: Trochida
- Superfamily: Trochoidea
- Family: Areneidae
- Genus: Arene
- Species: A. olivacea

Binomial name
- Arene olivacea (Dall, 1918)

Synonyms
- Arene winslowae Pilsbry & H. N. Lowe, 1932 junior subjective synonym; Liotia olivacea Dall, 1918; Liotia olivacea var. litharia Dall, 1918 junior subjective synonym

= Arene olivacea =

Species of gastropod

Arene olivacea is a species of sea snail, a marine gastropod mollusk in the family Areneidae.

== Description ==
(Original description by W.H. Dall) The height of the shell attains 5.5 mm and its diameter 6.2 mm. The shell consists of five depressed-turbinate whorls. The suture is narrow but not appressed. The color of the shell is very dark olivaceous, the prominent sculpture paler. The minute nucleus is decorticated, but apparently smooth. The spiral sculpture consists of, on the upper part of the body whorl, four strong elevated cords with wider, almost channeled interspaces. The two posterior cords are more adjacent. On the spire, only three cords are visible. The anterior is more or less undulated. On the base are a single cord, a wide interval, then three more adjacent smaller plain cords, the three close-set beaded cords at the verge, of the small perforate umbilicus. The aperture is circular. The upper lip is produced on the body. The interior is pearly white. (described as Liotia olivacea)

== Distribution ==
This species occurs in the Pacific Ocean off Panama.
