= Arene echinata =

Scientific classification
- Kingdom: Animalia
- Phylum: Mollusca
- Class: Gastropoda
- Subclass: Vetigastropoda
- Order: Trochida
- Superfamily: Trochoidea
- Family: Areneidae
- Genus: Arene
- Species: A. echinata

Binomial name
- Arene echinata McLean, 1970

Species of gastropod

Arene echinata is a species of sea snail, a marine gastropod mollusk in the family Areneidae.

== Distribution ==
This marine species occurs off the Galápagos Islands.
