= Cinysca alvesi =

Scientific classification
- Kingdom: Animalia
- Phylum: Mollusca
- Class: Gastropoda
- Subclass: Vetigastropoda
- Order: Trochida
- Family: Areneidae
- Genus: Cinysca
- Species: C. alvesi

Binomial name
- Cinysca alvesi Rubio & Rolan, 2002

Species of gastropod

Cinysca alvesi is a species of sea snail, a marine gastropod mollusk in the family Areneidae.

== Description ==
The shell cam grow to be 7 mm in length.

== Distribution ==
Cinysca alvesi can be found off of São Tomé and Principe.
