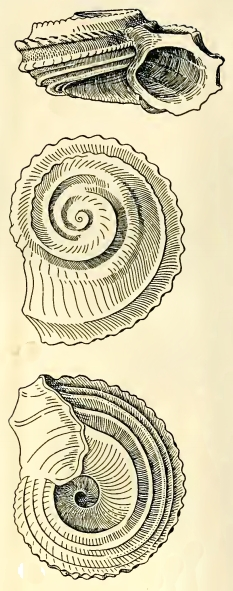
- Shell of Arene venusta

Scientific classification
- Kingdom: Animalia
- Phylum: Mollusca
- Class: Gastropoda
- Subclass: Vetigastropoda
- Order: Trochida
- Family: Areneidae
- Genus: Arene
- Species: A. venusta

Binomial name
- Arene venusta (Woodring, 1928)

Synonyms
- Liotia (Arene) venusta Woodring, 1928 (original combination); Liotia venusta Woodring, 1928 (primary homonym of Liotia venusta Hedley, 1901)

= Arene venusta =

Species of gastropod

Arene venusta is a species of small sea snail, a marine gastropod mollusk in the family Areneidae.

== Description ==
The shell can grow to be 2.4 mm in length and 3.2 mm in diameter.

(Original description) The minute shell has a very low spire and a relatively wide umbilicus. The peristome is continuous and thin. The sculpture of the body whorl comprises three prominent spiral cords separated by deep interspaces, crossed by strong axial threads that produce forward-facing scale-like projections on the two upper spirals. Two faint spiral cords are present near the suture. Under high magnification, numerous fine, irregular axial threads are visible. The base is sculptured with a peripheral spiral and three additional spirals arranged around the umbilical region. Axial sculpture on the base is generally obscure, except in and adjacent to the umbilicus.

== Distribution ==
Recent species occur off Panama, Honduras, Belize and Brazil.

Fossils of Arene venusta have been be found in Miocene strata in Bowden, Jamaica.
