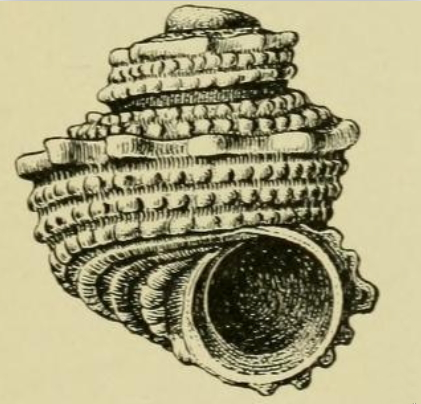
- Shell of Arene centrifuga (holotype)

Scientific classification
- Kingdom: Animalia
- Phylum: Mollusca
- Class: Gastropoda
- Subclass: Vetigastropoda
- Order: Trochida
- Family: Areneidae
- Genus: Arene
- Species: A. centrifuga

Binomial name
- Arene centrifuga (Dall, 1896)

Synonyms
- Liotia centrifuga Dall, 1896 (original combination)

= Arene centrifuga =

Species of gastropod

Arene centrifuga is a species of sea snail, a marine gastropod mollusc in the family Areneidae.

== Description ==
The shell can grow to be 3.5 mm in length and 3.5 in diameter

(Original description) The small shell is solid and elevated. It consists of four whorls.

The protoconch is smooth and flat-topped. It transitions rapidly into the teleoconch sculpture. The whorls are characterized by coarse, imbricated spiral sculpture. The sculpture is defined by five primary ridges between the sutures, all crossed by fine axial elements.

The axial sculpture of the entire surface is covered by fine, imbricating (overlapping) lamellae, visible under magnification, and obscure radial swellings. Between the sutures there are five spiral ridges, arranged as one ridge at the shoulder (the third), which develops distinctive subtriangular, radiating projecting points (typically eleven on the body whorl). Two ridges anterior (in front) of the shoulder. Two ridges posterior (behind) the shoulder.

The obscure radial swellings subtly undulate the two posterior spiral ridges. All spiral ridges are generally nodulous or serially sub-imbricated, but only the ridge at the shoulder forms large, projecting angles.

The periphery of the body whorl features three anterior spirals, followed by three spirals on the rounded base. The last basal spiral marginates the narrow, barely perforate umbilicus.

The aperture is circular and entire. The inner surface is smooth, but its margin is modified (indented or shaped) by the strong external sculpture.

== Distribution ==
Arene centrifuga can be found off of Cuba., Mexico, Florida, USA, Guadeloupe and the Bahamas.
