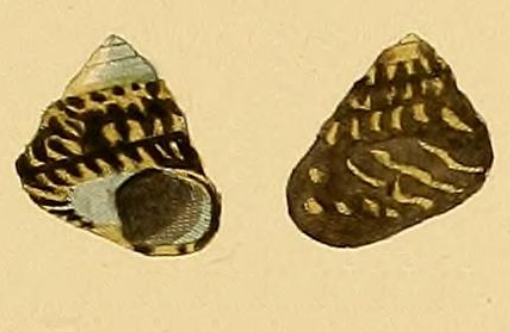
- Drawing of a shell of Arene tamsii (holotype)

Scientific classification
- Kingdom: Animalia
- Phylum: Mollusca
- Class: Gastropoda
- Subclass: Vetigastropoda
- Order: Trochida
- Superfamily: Trochoidea
- Family: Areneidae
- Genus: Arene
- Species: A. tamsii

Binomial name
- Arene tamsii (Philippi, 1852)

Synonyms
- Arene tamsiana [sic] misspelling - incorrect subsequent spelling; Trochus tamsii R. A. Philippi, 1852 superseded combination

= Arene tamsii =

Species of gastropod

Arene tamsii is a species of sea snail, a marine gastropod mollusk in the family Areneidae.

== Description ==
The shell can grow to be 4.4 mm in length.

(Original description in Latin) The shell is cone-shaped, acute, and sub-perforate (having a very small or partly closed umbilicus). Its color is black or dark purple, variegated with oblique white spots or streaks.

The whorls are slightly convex. The superior whorls are possess one keel. The body whorl possesses two keels. All keels are very blunt.

The base is convex and hollow in the center (referring to the umbilicus/perforation). The aperture is rhomboid-orbicular (diamond-shaped to nearly circular). The columella is oblique and terminates in a strong tooth.

== Distribution ==
Arene tamsii can be found from Venezuela to The Grenadines.
