= Cinysca jullieni =

Scientific classification
- Kingdom: Animalia
- Phylum: Mollusca
- Class: Gastropoda
- Subclass: Vetigastropoda
- Order: Trochida
- Superfamily: Trochoidea
- Family: Areneidae
- Genus: Cinysca
- Species: C. jullieni

Binomial name
- Cinysca jullieni Adam & Knudsen, 1969

Species of gastropod

Cinysca jullieni is a species of sea snail, a marine gastropod mollusc in the family Areneidae.
