= Cinysca forticostata =

Scientific classification
- Kingdom: Animalia
- Phylum: Mollusca
- Class: Gastropoda
- Subclass: Vetigastropoda
- Order: Trochida
- Superfamily: Trochoidea
- Family: Areneidae
- Genus: Cinysca
- Species: C. forticostata

Binomial name
- Cinysca forticostata (E. A. Smith, 1904)

Species of gastropod

Cinysca forticostata is a species of sea snail, a marine gastropod mollusk in the family Areneidae.

== Distribution ==
Cinysca forticostata can be found from Jeffery's Bay to East London, South Africa.
