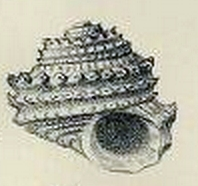
- Original drawing of a shell of Liotia echinacantha, now synonymised with A. echinacantha

Scientific classification
- Kingdom: Animalia
- Phylum: Mollusca
- Class: Gastropoda
- Subclass: Vetigastropoda
- Order: Trochida
- Superfamily: Trochoidea
- Family: Areneidae
- Genus: Arene
- Species: A. echinacantha

Binomial name
- Arene echinacantha (Melvill & Standen, 1903)

Synonyms
- Liotia echinacantha Melvill & Standen, 1903 ·

= Arene echinacantha =

Species of gastropod

Arene echinacantha is a species of sea snail, a marine gastropod mollusk in the family Areneidae.

== Description ==
The shell can grow to be 8 mm in length.

(Original description in Latin) This shell is globose, robust, and colored pale straw-yellow. A defining feature is its narrow but deep umbilicus. The shell's surface is profusely covered by its characteristic scaly spines, which are distinctly fluted and hollow.

The shell has four whorls. The protoconch is depressed and flat-topped, transitioning into subsequent whorls that are beautifully and densely sculpted with rows of specialized scales. These scales are echinate (spiny), hollow, and resemble miniature spines. The rows are organized as follows: the antepenultimate whorl has two rows; the penultimate whorl has three rows; the body whorl displays six main rows of scaly spines. The uppermost row on the last (and penultimate) whorl is the most prominent, featuring incurved scales that closely gird the shell. Below the periphery, surrounding the umbilicus, three innermost rows of scales are present but are not as highly developed as the main peripheral and superior rows.

The aperture is round and is lined internally with a pearly (nacreous) luster. The lip (peristome) is rather thick. The operculum is horny and multispiral.

== Distribution ==
Arene echinacantha can be found in the Red Sea and the Northwest Indian Ocean.
