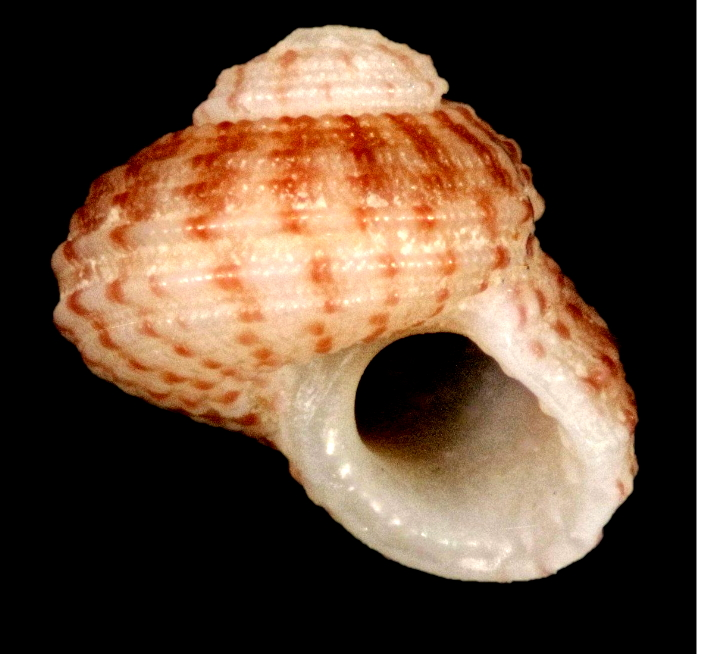
- Shell of Arene riisei (specimen at Naturalis Biodiversity Center)

Scientific classification
- Kingdom: Animalia
- Phylum: Mollusca
- Class: Gastropoda
- Subclass: Vetigastropoda
- Order: Trochida
- Family: Areneidae
- Genus: Arene
- Species: A. riisei

Binomial name
- Arene riisei Rehder, 1943

= Arene riisei =

Species of gastropod

Arene riisei is a species of small sea snail, a marine gastropod mollusk in the family Areneidae.

== Description ==
The shell can grow to be 4 mm to 8 mm in length.

== Distribution ==
Arene riisei can be found from Mexico to East Brazil.
