= Arene bitleri =

Scientific classification
- Kingdom: Animalia
- Phylum: Mollusca
- Class: Gastropoda
- Subclass: Vetigastropoda
- Order: Trochida
- Superfamily: Trochoidea
- Family: Areneidae
- Genus: Arene
- Species: A. bitleri

Binomial name
- Arene bitleri Olsson & McGinty, 1958

Synonyms
- Arene (Marevalvata) bitleri Olsson & McGinty, 1958 alternative representation; Gibbula tuberculosa auct. non d'Orbigny, 1842

Species of gastropod

Arene bitleri is a species of sea snail, a marine gastropod mollusk in the family Areneidae.

== Description ==
The shell can grow to be 3 mm to 5 mm in length.

== Distribution ==
Arene bitleri can be found from Panama to the Netherlands Antilles.
