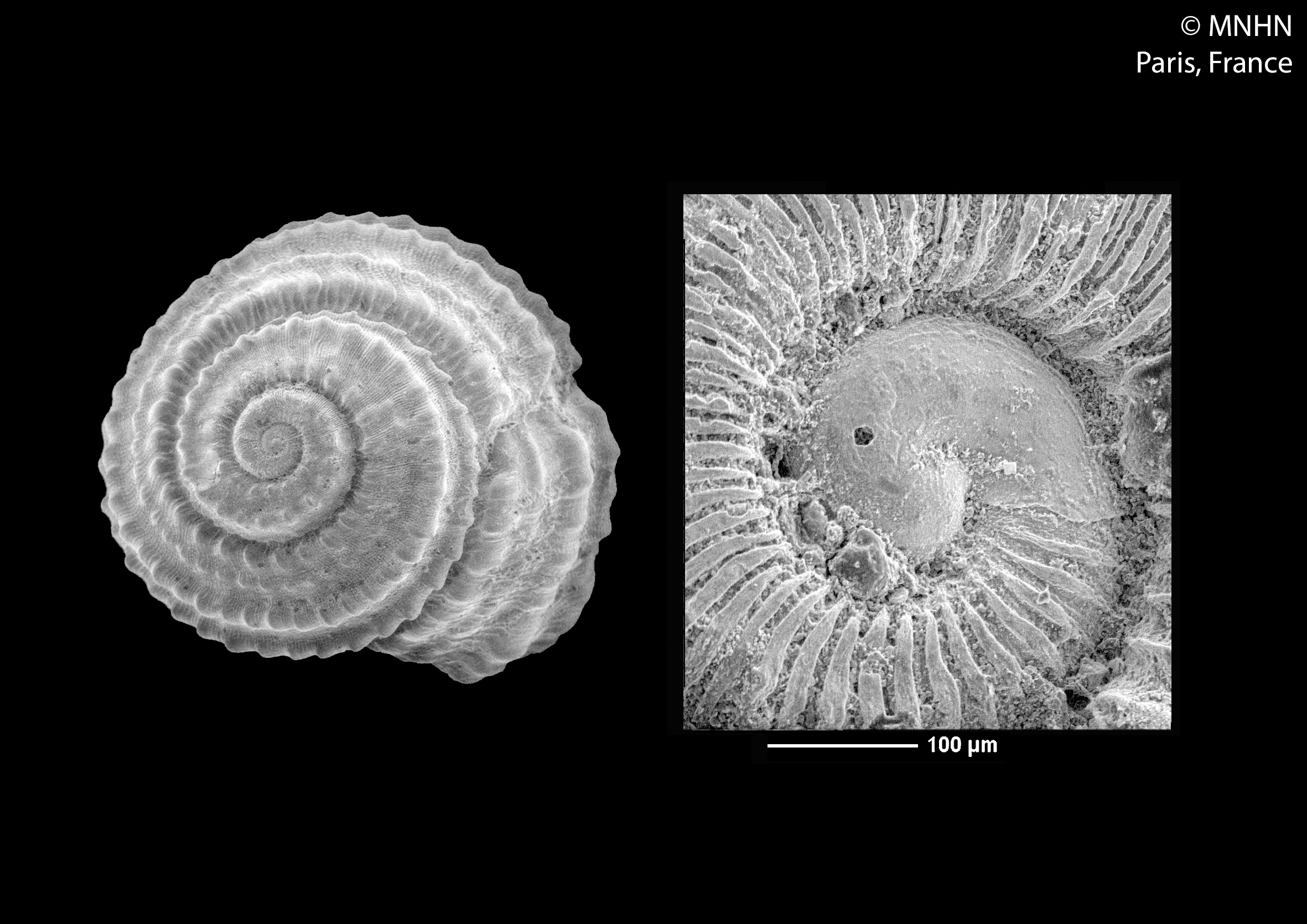
- Shell of Arene descensa (holotype at MNHN, Paris)
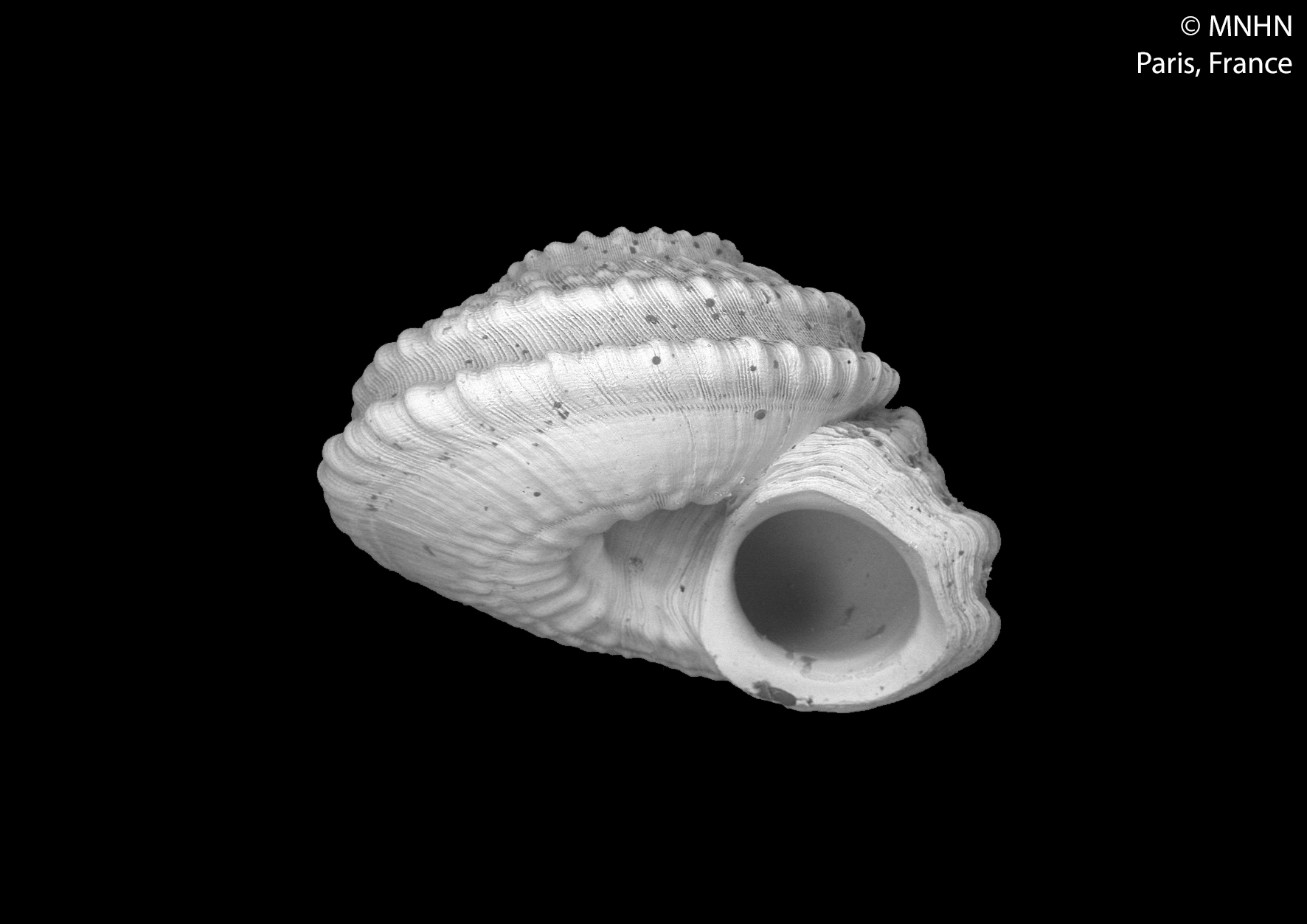
- Shell of Arene descensa (paratype at MNHN, Paris)

Scientific classification
- Kingdom: Animalia
- Phylum: Mollusca
- Class: Gastropoda
- Subclass: Vetigastropoda
- Order: Trochida
- Superfamily: Trochoidea
- Family: Areneidae
- Genus: Arene
- Species: A. descensa

Binomial name
- Arene descensa Rubio & Rolán, 2018

= Arene descensa =

Species of sea snail

Arene descensa is a species of sea snail, a marine gastropod mollusk in the family Areneidae.

== Identification ==
The original description by Rubio and Rolán provides detailed morphological characteristics, including shell size, coloration, and distinctive features that differentiate Arene descensa from closely related species.

== Distribution ==
This marine species occurs off French Guiana.
