= Merulempista saharae =

Scientific classification
- Domain: Eukaryota
- Kingdom: Animalia
- Phylum: Arthropoda
- Class: Insecta
- Order: Lepidoptera
- Family: Pyralidae
- Genus: Merulempista
- Species: M. saharae

Binomial name
- Merulempista saharae P. Leraut, 2002

Species of moth

Merulempista saharae is a species of snout moth in the genus Merulempista. It was described by Patrice J.A. Leraut in 2002 and is known from Morocco (including Maader Telmaout, the type location).
