= Merulempista ragonoti =

Scientific classification
- Domain: Eukaryota
- Kingdom: Animalia
- Phylum: Arthropoda
- Class: Insecta
- Order: Lepidoptera
- Family: Pyralidae
- Genus: Merulempista
- Species: M. ragonoti

Binomial name
- Merulempista ragonoti (Rothschild, 1913)

Synonyms
- Salebria ragonoti Rothschild, 1913; Tephris azrouella D. Lucas, 1933; Merulempista ragonoti juanella P. Leraut, 2002

Species of moth

Merulempista ragonoti is a species of snout moth. It is found in Portugal, France and North Africa, including Algeria and Morocco.

The wingspan is 16–20 mm. The forewings are buffy greyish white with reddish grey bands. The hindwings are also buffy greyish white.

The larvae feed on Tamarix africana.
