= Merulempista oppositalis =

Scientific classification
- Kingdom: Animalia
- Phylum: Arthropoda
- Class: Insecta
- Order: Lepidoptera
- Family: Pyralidae
- Genus: Merulempista
- Species: M. oppositalis

Binomial name
- Merulempista oppositalis (Walker, 1863)

Synonyms
- Trachonitis oppositalis Walker, 1863; Faveria oppositalis; Pempelia caliginosella Meyrick, 1879

Species of moth

Merulempista oppositalis is a species of snout moth in the genus Merulempista. It was described by Francis Walker in 1863 and is known from the Asian to Australian regions.
