= Merulempista jucundella =

Scientific classification
- Domain: Eukaryota
- Kingdom: Animalia
- Phylum: Arthropoda
- Class: Insecta
- Order: Lepidoptera
- Family: Pyralidae
- Genus: Merulempista
- Species: M. jucundella

Binomial name
- Merulempista jucundella (Chrétien, 1911)

Synonyms
- Salebria jucundella Chrétien, 1911

Species of moth

Merulempista jucundella is a species of snout moth in the genus Merulempista. It was described by Pierre Chrétien in 1911 and is known from Algeria (including Biskra, the type location).
