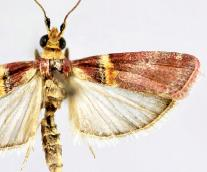

Scientific classification
- Kingdom: Animalia
- Phylum: Arthropoda
- Class: Insecta
- Order: Lepidoptera
- Family: Pyralidae
- Genus: Merulempista
- Species: M. rubriptera

Binomial name
- Merulempista rubriptera Li & Ren, 2011

= Merulempista rubriptera =

Species of moth

Merulempista rubriptera is a moth of the family Pyralidae. It is known from China (Inner Mongolia).

The wingspan is 23.5-24.5 mm. The head is khaki in males and pale yellowish brown in females. The antenna have a reddish-brown scape dorsally, yellow ventrally. The flagellum is yellowish brown ringed with brown. The thorax and tegula in males are rosy, in females greyish brown tinged with rosy. The forewings are rosy, with scattered greyish-white and black scales in the distal half and a longitudinal greyish-black stripe at the base just below the costa. The posterior margin is yellowish white at the base. The antemedian line is yellowish white and straight, its posterior half is tinged with black on the inside and ocherous yellow on the outside. The postmedian and subterminal lines are greyish white, slightly sinuate and nearly parallel. The cilia is rosy mixed with greyish brown, with a fine yellowish-white basal line. The hindwings are pale brown. The legs are rosy on the outside and yellowish white on the inside.

== Etymology ==
The specific epithet is derived from the Latin ruber (meaning red) and the suffix pteron (meaning wing) in reference to the colour of the forewing.
