= Merulempista wolschrijni =

Scientific classification
- Domain: Eukaryota
- Kingdom: Animalia
- Phylum: Arthropoda
- Class: Insecta
- Order: Lepidoptera
- Family: Pyralidae
- Genus: Merulempista
- Species: M. wolschrijni

Binomial name
- Merulempista wolschrijni Asselbergs, 1997

Species of moth

Merulempista wolschrijni is a species of snout moth. It is found in the Netherlands, where it is an introduced species.

The wingspan is 15 mm.
