= Macrarene spectabilospina =

Scientific classification
- Kingdom: Animalia
- Phylum: Mollusca
- Class: Gastropoda
- Subclass: Vetigastropoda
- Order: Trochida
- Superfamily: Trochoidea
- Family: Liotiidae
- Genus: Macrarene
- Species: M. spectabilospina

Binomial name
- Macrarene spectabilospina Shasky, 1970

Species of gastropod

Macrarene spectabilospina is a species of sea snail, a marine gastropod mollusk in the family Liotiidae.
