= Arene variabilis =

Scientific classification
- Kingdom: Animalia
- Phylum: Mollusca
- Class: Gastropoda
- Subclass: Vetigastropoda
- Order: Trochida
- Family: Areneidae
- Genus: Arene
- Species: A. variabilis

Binomial name
- Arene variabilis (Dall, 1889)

Synonyms
- Liotia (Arene) variabilis Dall, 1889 superseded combination; Liotia variabilis Dall, 1889 (original combination)

Species of gastropod

Arene variabilis is a species of sea snail, a marine gastropod mollusc in the family Areneidae.

== Description ==
The shell can grow to be 6 mm in length.

(Original description) The shell is trochiform (top-shaped), colored white or waxen, and comprises about five whorls, including a minute, smooth protoconch. The suture is distinct and channeled.

The shell's ornamentation is a combination of prominent axial and complex spiral elements. The axial sculpture consists of sharp, closely set, elevated lamellae (thin, plate-like ridges). These lamellae are continuous over the entire surface and conform closely to the lines of growth, though they are less elevated and more irregular than those of similar species. The spiral sculpture on the body whorl is complex and differentiated. A strong ridge is present near the suture, accompanied by a much smaller, adjacent ridge just external to it. The peripheral area features three major spirals: a very stout spiral near the periphery, another at the periphery, and a third slightly below and internal to the periphery, which defines the basal margin. The flattened area between the basal margin and the umbilical area has five or six fine, simple, raised spirals crossed by the axial lamellae.

The umbilicus is small and mostly smooth. It is bordered by an elaborate margin. The outer edge is marked by a stout rib bearing pointed nodules. Outside of this stout rib is a groove, followed by a finer spiral with rounded nodules.

In the typical shell form, a single spiral thread within the umbilicus bears sparse lamellar spines near the umbilical carina.

The aperture is nearly circular and hardly reflected. It is produced above and features a small row of faint, round tubercles on the lower inner edge, just within the margin. The operculum is horny and multispiral, dotted with bead-like, calcareous granules.

== Distribution ==
This marine species occurs in the Caribbean Sea, the Gulf of Mexico and the Lesser Antilles.
