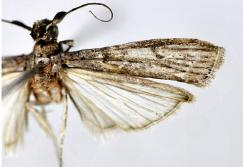

Scientific classification
- Domain: Eukaryota
- Kingdom: Animalia
- Phylum: Arthropoda
- Class: Insecta
- Order: Lepidoptera
- Family: Pyralidae
- Tribe: Phycitini
- Genus: Merulempista; Roesler, 1967

Species
- See text

= Merulempista =

Genus of moths

Merulempista is a genus of moths of the family Pyralidae described by Rolf-Ulrich Roesler in 1967.

It is a small genus of eleven described species and subspecies, distributed in the Palearctic realm except Merulempista cyclogramma occurring in the Indomalayan realm and Merulempista oppositalis ranging from the Indomalayan to Australasian realms.

== Species ==
- Merulempista cingillella (Zeller, 1846)
- Merulempista colorata Mey, 2011
- Merulempista cyclogramma (Hampson, 1896) (Oriental Region)
- Merulempista digitata Li & Ren, 2011
- Merulempista jucundella (Chrétien, 1911)
- Merulempista oppositalis (Walker, 1863) (Oriental to Australian regions)
- Merulempista ragonoti (Rothschild, 1913)
- Merulempista rubriptera Li & Ren, 2011
- Merulempista saharae P. Leraut, 2002
- Merulempista turturella (Zeller, 1848)
- Merulempista wolschrijni Asselbergs, 1997
