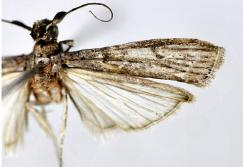

Scientific classification
- Kingdom: Animalia
- Phylum: Arthropoda
- Class: Insecta
- Order: Lepidoptera
- Family: Pyralidae
- Genus: Merulempista
- Species: M. cyclogramma

Binomial name
- Merulempista cyclogramma (Hampson, 1896)

Synonyms
- Phycita (Dioryctria) cyclogramma Hampson, 1896

= Merulempista cyclogramma =

Species of moth

Merulempista cyclogramma is a moth of the family Pyralidae. It is known from China (Guangxi), Indonesia (Sumatra), India and Sri Lanka.
