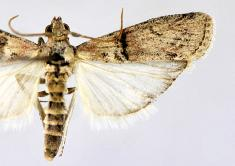

Scientific classification
- Kingdom: Animalia
- Phylum: Arthropoda
- Clade: Pancrustacea
- Class: Insecta
- Order: Lepidoptera
- Family: Pyralidae
- Genus: Merulempista
- Species: M. cingillella

Binomial name
- Merulempista cingillella (Zeller, 1846)

Synonyms
- Pempelia cingillella Zeller, 1846; Salebria cingilella; Meroptera cingillella; Merulempista cingillella hartigi Roesler, 1967; Pempelia brucella Staudinger, 1879; Tephris azronella D. Lucas, 1933; Trachonitis myricariella Millière, 1864

= Merulempista cingillella =

Species of moth

Merulempista cingillella is a moth of the family Pyralidae. It is known from China (Hebei, Inner Mongolia, Qinghai, Ningxia, Tianjin, Xinjiang), Albania, Austria, Bosnia and Herzegovina, Croatia, France, Germany, Hungary, Italy, Russia, Slovakia, Spain, Switzerland, Turkey, Ukraine and Morocco.

The larvae feed on Myricaria germanica, Tamarix gracilis and other Tamarix species
