= Macrarene coronadoensis =

Scientific classification
- Kingdom: Animalia
- Phylum: Mollusca
- Class: Gastropoda
- Subclass: Vetigastropoda
- Order: Trochida
- Superfamily: Trochoidea
- Family: Liotiidae
- Genus: Macrarene
- Species: M. coronadoensis

Binomial name
- Macrarene coronadoensis Stohler, 1959

Species of gastropod

Macrarene coronadoensis is a species of sea snail, a marine gastropod mollusk in the family Liotiidae.

== Description ==
The height of the shell attains 23.2 mm., its diameter 26.9 mm. The nacreous white shell is rather large for the genus and contains 3½ rapidly enlarging whorls. The whorls have a smooth surface. The body whorl and the preceding whorl show two parallel rows of short projections. These are quite distinct and equally strong. Each row contains between 7 and 12 projections (in most cases 9 or 10). These projections don't point upward but project horizontally. The second row of projections below the periphery distinguishes this species from Macrarene farallonensis. There is no pronounced axial sculpture on the base of the shell. The aperture is circular. Inside it is shiny and pearly. The polygyrous operculum is horny.

== Distribution ==
This species occurs in the Pacific Ocean off the Coronado Islands, California.
