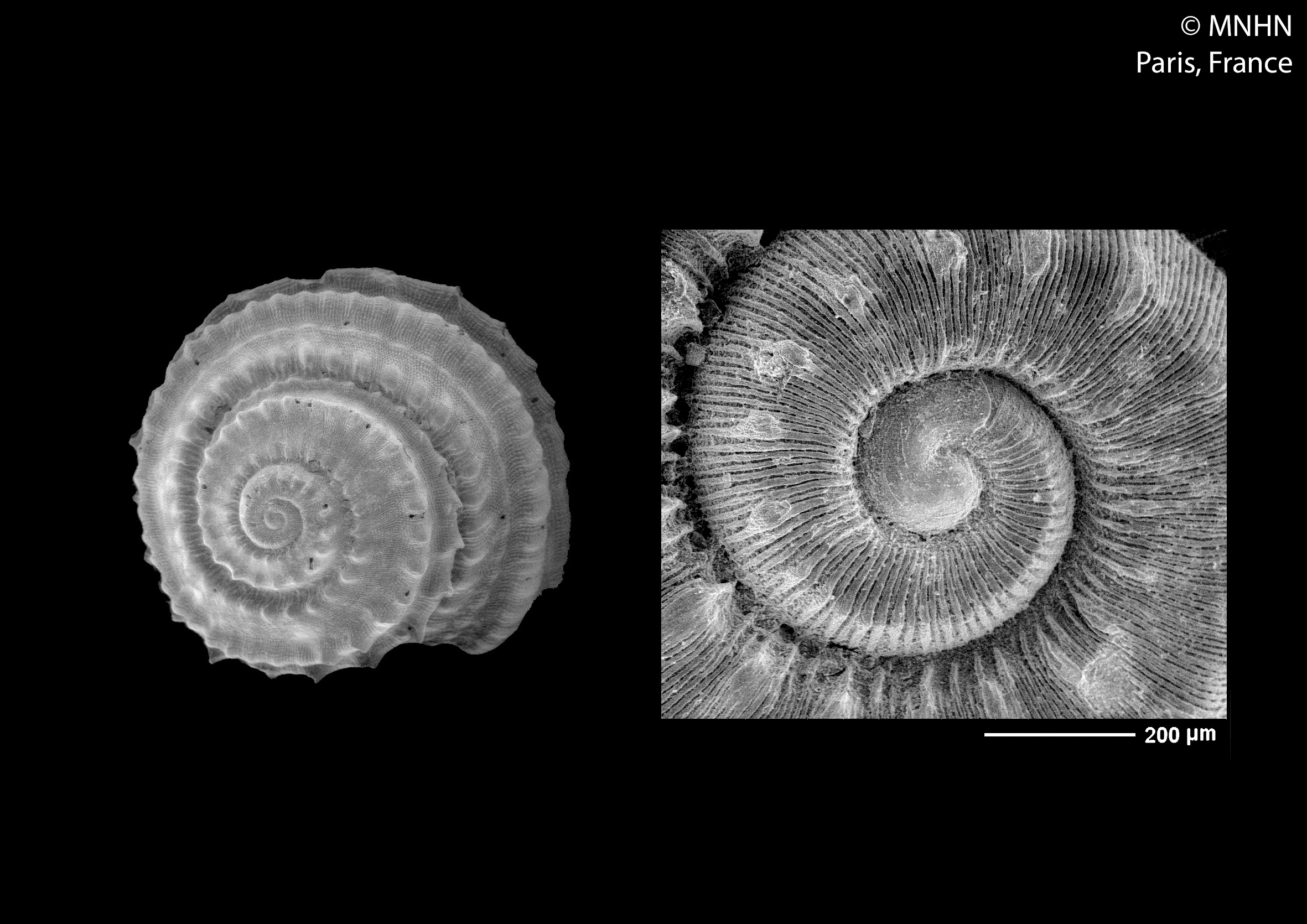
- Shell of Arene guyanensis (holotype at MNHN, Paris)

Scientific classification
- Kingdom: Animalia
- Phylum: Mollusca
- Class: Gastropoda
- Subclass: Vetigastropoda
- Order: Trochida
- Superfamily: Trochoidea
- Family: Areneidae
- Genus: Arene
- Species: A. guyanensis

Binomial name
- Arene guyanensis Rubio & Rolán, 2018

= Arene guyanensis =

Species of sea snail

Arene guyanensis is a species of sea snail, a marine gastropod mollusk in the family Areneidae.

== Distribution ==
This marine species occurs off French Guiana.
