= Merulempista turturella =

Scientific classification
- Kingdom: Animalia
- Phylum: Arthropoda
- Clade: Pancrustacea
- Class: Insecta
- Order: Lepidoptera
- Family: Pyralidae
- Genus: Merulempista
- Species: M. turturella

Binomial name
- Merulempista turturella (Zeller, 1848)

Synonyms
- Pempelia turturella Zeller, 1848; Salebria numidella Ragonot, 1890; Merulempista turturella numidella; Psorosa gelinella D. Lucas, 1909; Salebria numidella var. saturatella Caradja, 1910

Species of moth

Merulempista turturella is a species of snout moth. It is found in Spain, France, Italy, the Canary Islands and North Africa, including Algeria.

The wingspan is 12–16 mm.

The larvae feed on Tamarix canariensis.
