= Merulempista colorata =

Scientific classification
- Kingdom: Animalia
- Phylum: Arthropoda
- Clade: Pancrustacea
- Class: Insecta
- Order: Lepidoptera
- Family: Pyralidae
- Genus: Merulempista
- Species: M. colorata

Binomial name
- Merulempista colorata Mey, 2011

Species of moth

Merulempista colorata is a species of snout moth in the genus Merulempista. It was described by Wolfram Mey in 2011 and is known from Namibia.
