= Arene flexispina =

Scientific classification
- Kingdom: Animalia
- Phylum: Mollusca
- Class: Gastropoda
- Subclass: Vetigastropoda
- Order: Trochida
- Superfamily: Trochoidea
- Family: Areneidae
- Genus: Arene
- Species: A. flexispina

Binomial name
- Arene flexispina Leal & Coelho, 1985

Species of gastropod

Arene flexispina is a species of sea snail, a marine gastropod mollusk in the family Areneidae.

== Description ==
The shell can grow up to be 7 mm in length and is solid, trochoid in shape, reddish brown, with spiral rows and spines of lighter color. The ratio of height/width of the shell higher in adults than in younger specimens. The whorls 5 ½, the first 1 ½ comprising the protoconch; white and smooth, lower than the subsequent whorl. The Teleoconch whorls with 2 larger peripheral spiral rows of 10 or 11 large, fluted spines spirally raised and imbricated. Narrower row 1-2 subsutural, one intermediate (between the 2 larger) and one immediately above the subsequent whorl, with numerous imbricated scale-like spines, smaller than those in the 2 larger rows. Additionally, Finely incised axial lines are found on entire shell microscopic and crowded. Its body is whorl rounded, with wider spiral cords; spines in the 2 larger cords that are triangular, bent outwards and sharply pointed in apical view; spines number the same as in the spire. The base consists of 4 or 5 well-separated beaded spiral cords; beads almost imperceptible in worn specimens. The cord bordering the umbilicus the same size or only slightly larger than the other basal cords (younger specimens). The Umbilicus is wide, deep and twisted, with fine axial lines internally. One or two cords entering the umbilicus in younger shells, is absent in mature specimens. The Aperture is whitish, oblique, with the Outer lip thin, with crenulations corresponding to the external spiral ornamentation. The Operculum round, multispiral, with small radial lines gives the beaded aspect its calcareous external surface, with an attachment side being horny and convex.

== Distribution ==
Arene flexispina can be found off of East Brazil.
