= Macrarene lepidotera =

Scientific classification
- Kingdom: Animalia
- Phylum: Mollusca
- Class: Gastropoda
- Subclass: Vetigastropoda
- Order: Trochida
- Superfamily: Trochoidea
- Family: Liotiidae
- Genus: Macrarene
- Species: M. lepidotera

Binomial name
- Macrarene lepidotera McLean, 1970

Species of gastropod

Macrarene lepidotera is a species of sea snail, a marine gastropod mollusk in the family Liotiidae.

== Distribution ==
This marine species occurs in the Pacific Ocean off Socorro Island and Revillagigedo Islands, Mexico
