= Conus cazalisoi =

Scientific classification
- Kingdom: Animalia
- Phylum: Mollusca
- Class: Gastropoda
- Subclass: Caenogastropoda
- Order: Neogastropoda
- Superfamily: Conoidea
- Family: Conidae
- Genus: Conus
- Species: C. cazalisoi

Binomial name
- Conus cazalisoi (Cossignani & Fiadeiro, 2018)

Synonyms
- Africonus cazalisoi Cossignani & Fiadeiro, 2018 (original combination)

Species of sea snail

Conus cazalisoi is a species of sea snail, a marine gastropod mollusc in the family Conidae, the cone snails, cone shells or cones. This marine species of cone snail occurs off the Cape Verdes.

They are predatory and venomous and is capable of stinging humans.
