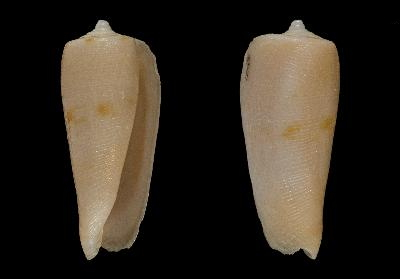
- Shell of Conus cymbioides (holotype in MNHN, Paris)

Scientific classification
- Kingdom: Animalia
- Phylum: Mollusca
- Class: Gastropoda
- Subclass: Caenogastropoda
- Order: Neogastropoda
- Superfamily: Conoidea
- Family: Conidae
- Genus: Conus
- Species: C. cymbioides

Binomial name
- Conus cymbioides Monnier, Tenorio, Bouchet & Puillandre, 2018

Synonyms
- Conus (Textilia) cymbioides Monnier, Tenorio, Bouchet & Puillandre, 2018

= Conus cymbioides =

Species of sea snail

Conus cymbioides is a species of sea snail, a marine gastropod mollusk in the family Conidae, the cone snails and their allies.

Like all species within the genus Conus, these snails are predatory and venomous. They are capable of stinging humans, therefore live ones should be handled carefully or not at all.

== Description ==
The length of the shell of the holotype attains 24.2 mm.

== Distribution ==
This marine species occurs off Southern Madagascar.
