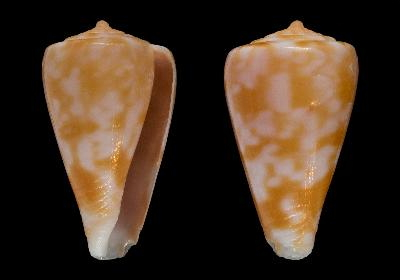
- Shell of Conus galeyi (holotype in MNHN, Paris]

Scientific classification
- Kingdom: Animalia
- Phylum: Mollusca
- Class: Gastropoda
- Subclass: Caenogastropoda
- Order: Neogastropoda
- Superfamily: Conoidea
- Family: Conidae
- Genus: Conus
- Species: C. galeyi

Binomial name
- Conus galeyi Monnier, Tenorio, Bouchet & Puillandre, 2018

Synonyms
- Conus (Phasmoconus) galeyi Monnier, Tenorio, Bouchet & Puillandre, 2018· accepted, alternate representation

= Conus galeyi =

Species of sea snail

Conus galeyi is a species of sea snail, a marine gastropod mollusc in the family Conidae, the cone snails, cone shells or cones.

This snail is predatory and venomous and is capable of stinging humans.

== Description ==
The length of the shell of the holotype measures 20.8 mm (0.82 in).

== Distribution ==
This marine species of cone snail occurs off Southern Madagascar.
