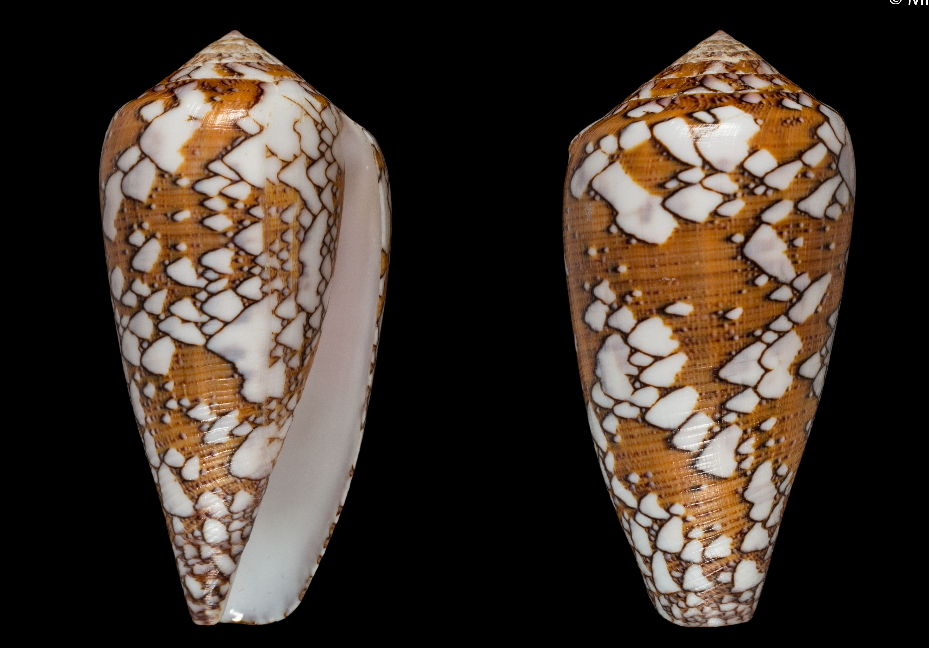
- Shell of Conus rosiae (holotype at the MNHN, Paris)

Scientific classification
- Domain: Eukaryota
- Kingdom: Animalia
- Phylum: Mollusca
- Class: Gastropoda
- Subclass: Caenogastropoda
- Order: Neogastropoda
- Superfamily: Conoidea
- Family: Conidae
- Genus: Conus
- Species: C. rosiae

Binomial name
- Conus rosiae (Monnier, Batifoix & Limpalaër, 2018)

Synonyms
- Conus (Darioconus) rosiae (Monnier, Batifoix & Limpalaër, 2018) · alternative representation; Darioconus rosiae Monnier, Batifoix & Limpalaër, 2018

= Conus rosiae =

Species of sea snail

Conus rosiae is a species of sea snail, a marine gastropod mollusk in the family Conidae, the cone snails and their allies.

Like all species within the genus Conus, these snails are predatory and venomous. They are capable of stinging humans, therefore live ones should be handled carefully or not at all.

== Description ==
The size of the shell varies attains 55 mm.

== Distribution ==
This marine species occurs off southwest Madagascar.
