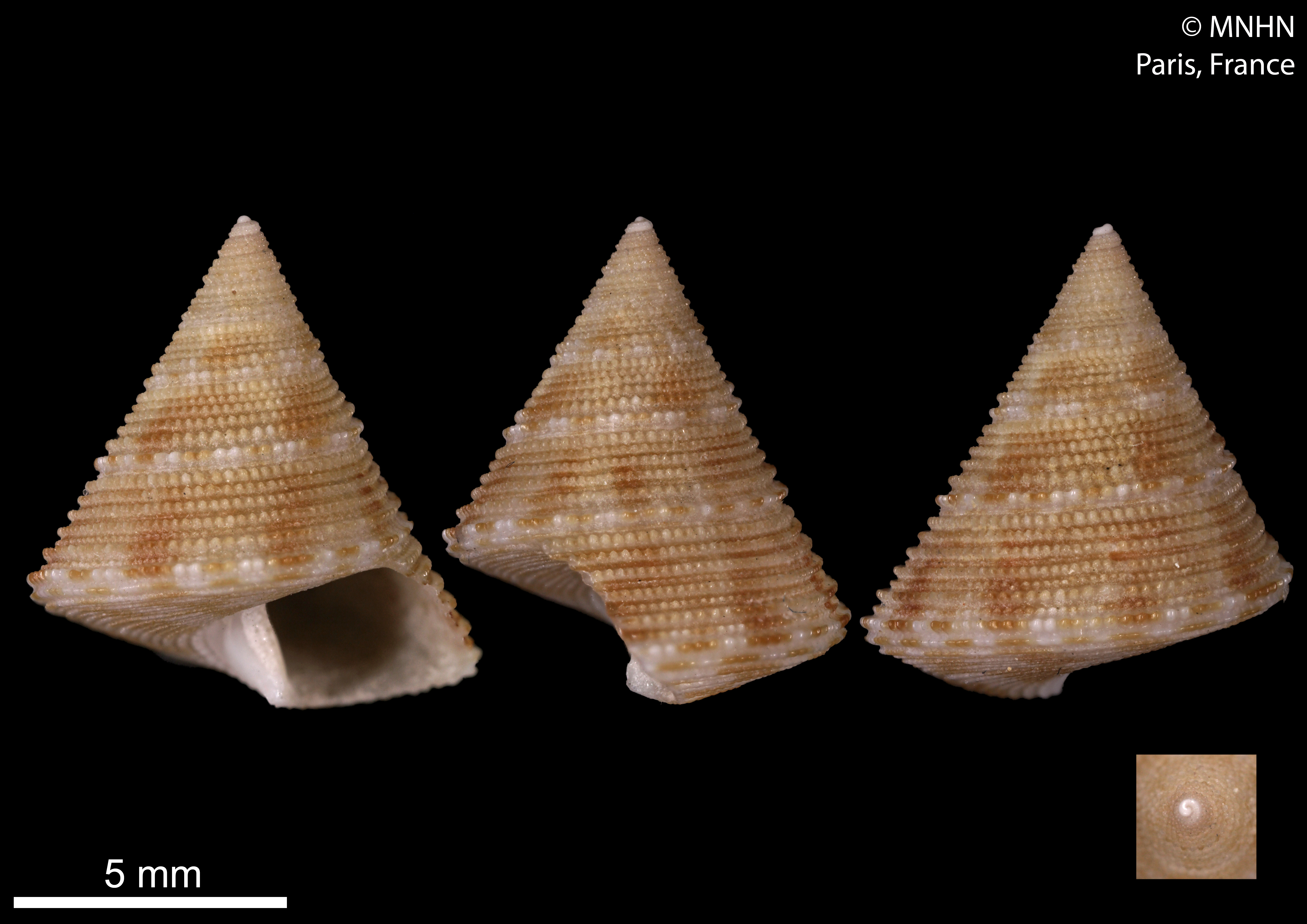
- Shell of Calliostoma maekawai (paratype at MNHN, Paris)

Scientific classification
- Kingdom: Animalia
- Phylum: Mollusca
- Class: Gastropoda
- Subclass: Vetigastropoda
- Order: Trochida
- Superfamily: Trochoidea
- Family: Calliostomatidae
- Subfamily: Calliostomatinae
- Genus: Calliostoma
- Species: C. maekawai

Binomial name
- Calliostoma maekawai Poppe, Tagaro & Goto, 2018

= Calliostoma maekawai =

Species of gastropod

Calliostoma maekawai is a species of sea snail, a marine gastropod mollusk, in the family Calliostomatidae within the superfamily Trochoidea, the top snails, turban snails and their allies.

== Distribution ==
This species occurs in Philippines.
