= Macrarene digitata =

- Apertural view of a shell of Macrarene digitata from Brazil

Scientific classification
- Kingdom: Animalia
- Phylum: Mollusca
- Class: Gastropoda
- Subclass: Vetigastropoda
- Order: Trochida
- Superfamily: Trochoidea
- Family: Liotiidae
- Genus: Macrarene
- Species: M. digitata

Binomial name
- Macrarene digitata McLean, Absalao & Santos Cruz, 1988

Synonyms
- Liotia admirabilis auct. non E. A. Smith, 1890

Species of gastropod

Macrarene digitata is a species of sea snail, a marine gastropod mollusk in the family Liotiidae.

== Description ==
The maximum reported length of the shell is 6.7 mm.

== Distribution ==
This species occurs in the Atlantic Ocean off Brazil at depths between 40 m and 146 m.
