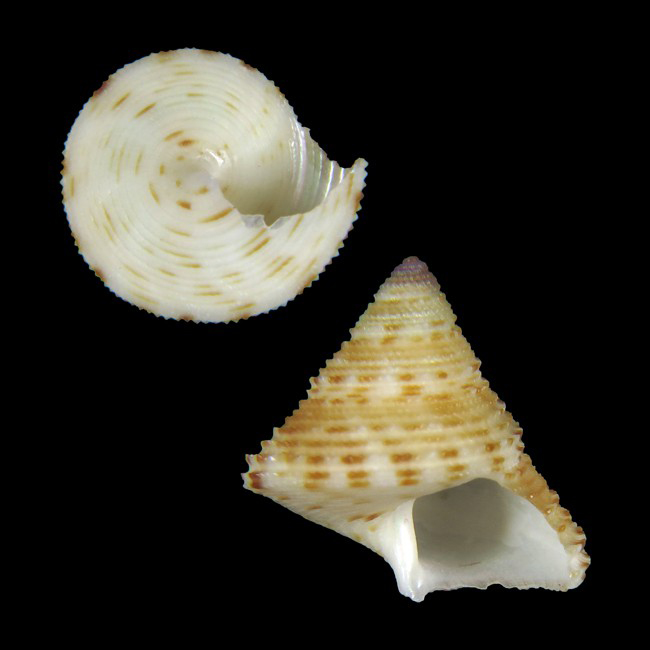

Scientific classification
- Kingdom: Animalia
- Phylum: Mollusca
- Class: Gastropoda
- Subclass: Vetigastropoda
- Order: Trochida
- Family: Calliostomatidae
- Genus: Calliostoma
- Species: C. katorii

Binomial name
- Calliostoma katorii Poppe, Tagaro & Goto, 2018

= Calliostoma katorii =

Species of gastropod

Calliostoma katorii is a species of sea snail, a marine gastropod mollusk in the family Calliostomatidae.

== Distribution ==
This marine species occurs off the Philippines.

== Original description ==
- Poppe G.T., Tagaro S.P. & Goto Y. (2018). New marine species from the Central Philippines. Visaya. 5(1): 91–135. page(s): 95, pl. 3 figs 1–3.
