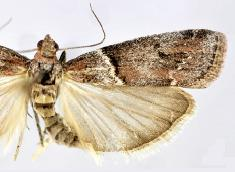

Scientific classification
- Domain: Eukaryota
- Kingdom: Animalia
- Phylum: Arthropoda
- Class: Insecta
- Order: Lepidoptera
- Family: Pyralidae
- Genus: Merulempista
- Species: M. digitata

Binomial name
- Merulempista digitata Li & Ren, 2011

= Merulempista digitata =

Species of moth

Merulempista digitata is a moth of the family Pyralidae. It is known from China (Gansu, Xinjiang).

The wingspan is 22–27 mm.
