= Cinysca =

Scientific classification
- Kingdom: Animalia
- Phylum: Mollusca
- Class: Gastropoda
- Subclass: Vetigastropoda
- Order: Trochida
- Family: Areneidae
- Genus: Cinysca; Killburn, 1970

Type species
- Cyclostrema granulatum A. Adams, 1853

Synonyms
- Cynisca Adams & Adams, 1854 non Gray, 1844

Genus of gastropods

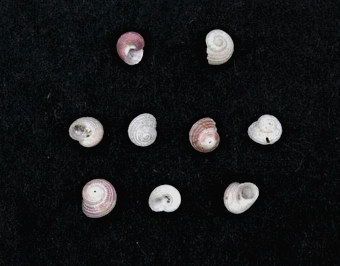
Cinysca dunkeri

Cinysca is a genus of sea snails, marine gastropod mollusks in the family Areneidae.

== Species ==
Species within the genus Cinysca include:

- Cinysca alvesi Rubio & Rolan, 2002
- Cinysca arlequin Rubio & Rolan, 2002
- Cinysca bicarinata (Martens, 1902)
- Cinysca dunkeri (Philippi, 1852)
- Cinysca forticostata (E. A. Smith, 1904)
- Cinysca inhambanensis S.-I Huang, 2025
- Cinysca granulata (A. Adams, 1853) (nomen nudum)
- Cinysca jullieni Adam & Knudsen, 1969
- Cinysca mossambica S.-I Huang, 2025
- Cinysca paradisi S.-I Huang, 2025
- Cinysca semiclausa (Thiele, 1925) (taxon inquirendum)
- Cinysca spuria (Gould, 1861)

Species brought into synonymy

- Cinysca granulosa (Krauss, 1848): synonym of Cinysca dunkeri (Philippi, 1853)
