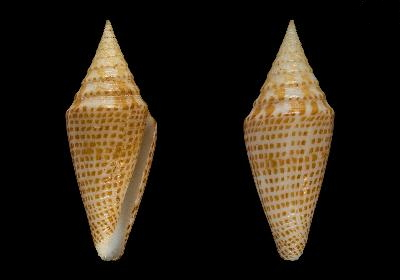
- Shells of Conus aequiquadratus (holotype in MNHN, Paris)

Scientific classification
- Kingdom: Animalia
- Phylum: Mollusca
- Class: Gastropoda
- Subclass: Caenogastropoda
- Order: Neogastropoda
- Superfamily: Conoidea
- Family: Conidae
- Genus: Conus
- Species: C. aequiquadratus

Binomial name
- Conus aequiquadratus Monnier, Tenorio, Bouchet & Puillandre, 2018

Synonyms
- Conus (Turriconus) aequiquadratus Monnier, Tenorio, Bouchet & Puillandre, 2018· accepted, alternate representation

= Conus aequiquadratus =

Species of sea snail

Conus aequiquadratus, common name Flashman's cone, is a species of sea snail, a marine gastropod mollusc in the family Conidae, the cone snails, cone shells or cones.

This snail is predatory and venomous and is capable of stinging humans.

== Description ==
The shell of this snail has orange spots on a white background, with a white interior. From its sharp point, to the end of the opening some shells reach up to 44.2mm in length.

== Distribution ==
This marine species of cone snail occurs off Madagascar.
