= Macrarene cookeana =

Scientific classification
- Kingdom: Animalia
- Phylum: Mollusca
- Class: Gastropoda
- Subclass: Vetigastropoda
- Order: Trochida
- Superfamily: Trochoidea
- Family: Liotiidae
- Genus: Macrarene
- Species: M. cookeana

Binomial name
- Macrarene cookeana (Dall, 1918)

Synonyms
- Arene coronadensis (Stohler, 1959); Liotia (Arene) cookeana Dall, 1918; Macrarene coronadensis Stohler, 1959 junior subjective synonym; Cyclostrema cookeanum (Dall, 1918)

Species of gastropod

Macrarene cookeana, common name Miss Cooke's liotia, is a species of sea snail, a marine gastropod mollusk in the family Liotiidae.

== Description ==
The length of the shell varies between 18 mm and 30 mm.

== Distribution ==
This species occurs in the Pacific Ocean off Baja California, Mexico.
