= Fusinus agatha =

Scientific classification
- Kingdom: Animalia
- Phylum: Mollusca
- Class: Gastropoda
- Subclass: Caenogastropoda
- Order: Neogastropoda
- Family: Fasciolariidae
- Genus: Fusinus
- Species: F. agatha

Binomial name
- Fusinus agatha (Simone & Abbate, 2005)

Synonyms
- Fasciolaria agatha Simone & Abbate, 2005 (original combination)

Species of gastropod

Fusinus agatha is a species of sea snail, a marine gastropod mollusk in the family Fasciolariidae, the spindle snails, the tulip snails and their allies.
