= Macrarene farallonensis =

Scientific classification
- Kingdom: Animalia
- Phylum: Mollusca
- Class: Gastropoda
- Subclass: Vetigastropoda
- Order: Trochida
- Superfamily: Trochoidea
- Family: Liotiidae
- Genus: Macrarene
- Species: M. farallonensis

Binomial name
- Macrarene farallonensis (A. G. Smith, 1952)

Synonyms
- Arene farallonensis (A. G. Smith, 1952); Liotia farallonensis A. G. Smith, 1952 (original combination)

Species of gastropod

Macrarene farallonensis is a species of sea snail, a marine gastropod mollusk in the family Liotiidae.

== Distribution ==
This marine species occurs in the Pacific Ocean off Farallon Island, near San Francisco, USA. It was originally collected from sea bird guano.
