= Macrarene californica =

Scientific classification
- Kingdom: Animalia
- Phylum: Mollusca
- Class: Gastropoda
- Subclass: Vetigastropoda
- Order: Trochida
- Superfamily: Trochoidea
- Family: Liotiidae
- Genus: Macrarene
- Species: M. californica

Binomial name
- Macrarene californica (Dall, 1908)

Synonyms
- Arene californica (W. H. Dall, 1908); Liotia (Arene) californica Dall, 1908

Species of gastropod

Macrarene californica, common name the Californian liotia, is a species of sea snail, a marine gastropod mollusk in the family Liotiidae.

Subspecies

- Macrarene californica californica (Dall, 1908) (synonym: Arene pacis (Dall, 1908))

== Description ==
(Original description by W.H. Dall) The height of the shell attains 15 mm, its diameter 23 mm. The rude, yellowish-white shell is large for the genus. It has a depressed shape with about six whorls, carrying at the shoulder six blunt, large, projecting tubercles. The nucleus is small, the nepionic whorls reticulate and flattened. The later whorls are keeled bluntly at the shoulder, behind which they are flattened. On the flat area are two strong, elevated, spiral threads (which later disappear) close together, with the channels on either side reticulated by subequal and subequally spaced radial threads. On the body whorl all the sculpture on the upper part of the whorl, except the keel connecting the tubercles at the shoulder, has disappeared. The surface of the shell is spongy in texture, and all the sculpture appears obscure, almost deliquescent. The base of the shell is rounded, featuring a large, deep spiral umbilicus, which leads into a spiral keel ending at a projection of the pillar lip. The edge of the umbilicus is rounded and spongy. Outside this ridge, in young specimens, the shell is constricted by a row of pits, and between these and the periphery, some specimens show faint spirals. The aperture is circular within, and when fresh, brilliantly pearly, but the pearly coating is very thin and seems to disappear in dead shells. The outer margin of the aperture, which is very thick, is modified by the umbilical keel and other sculpture. The operculum is multispiral, with the external edges of the whorls fringed, very concave, and showing hardly any calcareous deposit.

This species is usually covered with Polyzoa, Lithothamnion, and other adherent matter, which obscures its appearance, but the shell itself is so rude, spongy, and bleached in appearance that the actual surface is often discriminated only when examined with a lens.

== Distribution ==
This marine species occurs in the Gulf of California, Western Mexico
