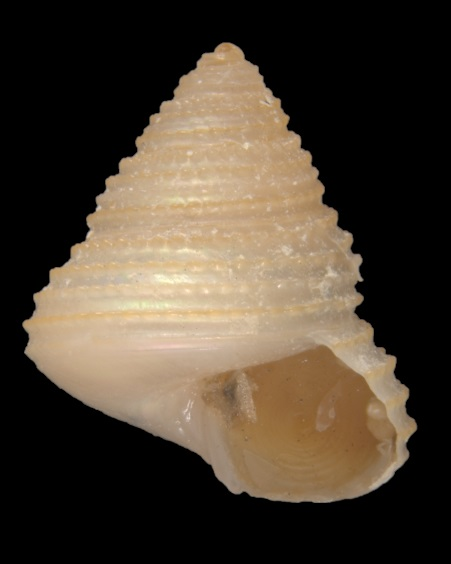
- A subadult shell of C. melliferum with its respective operculum

Scientific classification
- Kingdom: Animalia
- Phylum: Mollusca
- Class: Gastropoda
- Subclass: Vetigastropoda
- Order: Trochida
- Family: Calliostomatidae
- Subfamily: Calliostomatinae
- Genus: Calliostoma
- Species: C. melliferum

Binomial name
- Calliostoma melliferum Cavallari & Simone, 2018

= Calliostoma melliferum =

Species of gastropod

Calliostoma melliferum is a species of sea snail, a marine mollusk of the gastropod class in the family Calliostomatidae.

== Description ==
The shell of Calliostoma melliferum is relatively small for a species in the genus Calliostoma, with maximum height ranging from 8 mm to 10 mm.

== Distribution ==
This species is only known from Canopus Bank, a seamount off the northeastern coast of Brazil, at depths between 60 m and 260 m.
