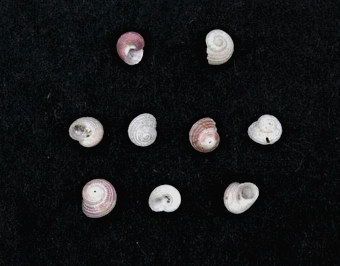
- Cinysca dunkeri

Scientific classification
- Kingdom: Animalia
- Phylum: Mollusca
- Class: Gastropoda
- Subclass: Vetigastropoda
- Order: Trochida
- Superfamily: Trochoidea
- Family: Areneidae; McLean, 2012

Genera
- See text

= Areneidae =

Family of gastropods

Areneidae is a family of sea snails, marine gastropod mollusks in the clade Vetigastropoda.

Areneidae was previously not officially described as a taxon name. Areneidae is provisionally placed within the superfamily Angarioidea according to Williams et al. (2008). In 2012 it was moved to the superfamily Trochoidea

== Genera ==
There are two genera within the family Areneidae:

- Arene H. Adams & A. Adams, 1854
- Cinysca Killburn, 1970
- † Mcleanarene Pacaud, 2023
- † Pictarene Pacaud, 2023
- † Xamaycarene Pacaud, 2023

Synonyms

- Cynisca H. Adams & A. Adams, 1854: synonym of Cinysca Kilburn, 1970 (Invalid: junior homonym of Cynisca Gray, 1844; Cinysca Kilburn, 1970 is a replacement name)
- Marevalvata Olsson & Harbison, 1953: synonym of Arene H. Adams & A. Adams, 1854
