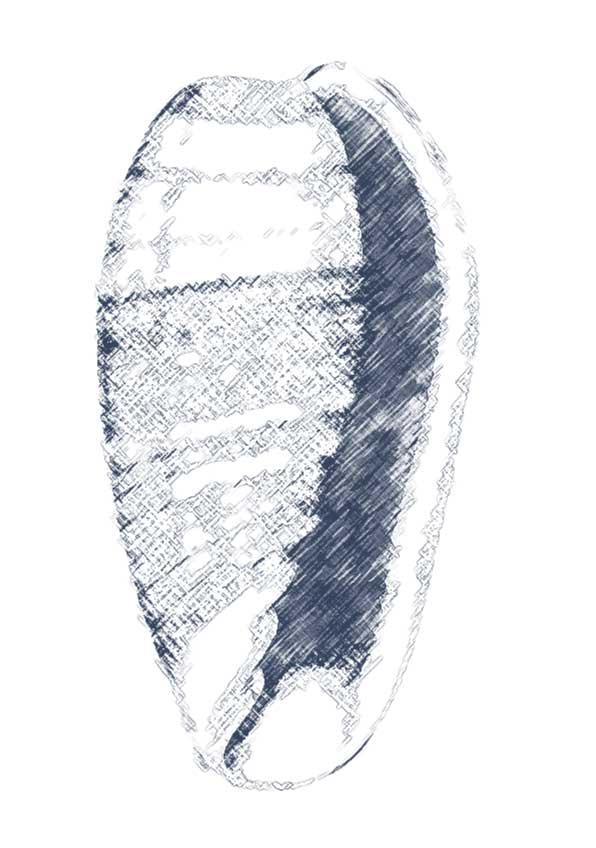

Scientific classification
- Kingdom: Animalia
- Phylum: Mollusca
- Class: Gastropoda
- Subclass: Caenogastropoda
- Order: Neogastropoda
- Family: Marginellidae
- Subfamily: Marginellinae
- Genus: Bullata; Jousseaume, 1875

Synonyms
- Bullata Jousseaume, 1875 167, 250; Marginella, subg. Volutella Swainson, 1830 :(2)1; Marginella pl.1 (non Perry, 1810); Marginella bullata Lamarck, 1822 Voluta bullata Born, 1778; Gibberulina Monterosato, 1884:139 [invalid emendation, as "nom. sost."]

= Bullata =

Genus of gastropods

Bullata is a genus of sea snails, marine gastropod mollusks in the family Marginellidae, the margin snails.

== Distribution ==
This is a tropical western Atlantic genus.

== Habitat ==
Representatives from this genus have been recorded at depths from one to 60 metres.

== Shell description ==
The shells of species in this genus are moderately large to very large, range size from 14 mm (Bullata largillieri, smallest species of Bullata) to 97.9 mm (largest specimen known of Bullata bullata). (pl I)

The shell color is a yellowish-orange to orange- or pinkish-brown, spirally banded (pl II) or with white spots (pl III). The lip is pink, yellow, or orange, darker than shell color (pl IV).

The shell surface is smooth and glossy.

The shape is elliptical to oblong or obovate, moderately to strongly shouldered (pl V bottom). The spire is immersed or near so (pl V top). The aperture is narrow to moderately broad, wider anteriorly. The lip is moderately strongly thickened, weakly to strongly denticulate in adults, with a distinct external varix. A siphonal notch is present but a posterior notch is absent. The parietal callusing is weakly to strongly developed, especially posteriorly, and is absent in type species. The columella has four continuous plications occupying less than half the aperture length. The internal whorls are unmodified. (pl VI/VII)

== Remarks ==
The large, patterned shells with an immersed spire and 4 moderately heavy columellar plications which are not crowded anteriorly, serve to distinguish this group of species. This genus is restricted to the Caribbean province, where it evolved in the Miocene as a direct offshoot of Prunum.

Coan (1965:189) placed Cryptospyra as a subgenus of Bullata. Coovert & Coovert (1995:93) consider as distinct genus, as they have separate origins: Bullata is a direct descendant of Caribbean Prunum, whereas Cryptospira is restricted to the western Indo-Pacific where it evolved.

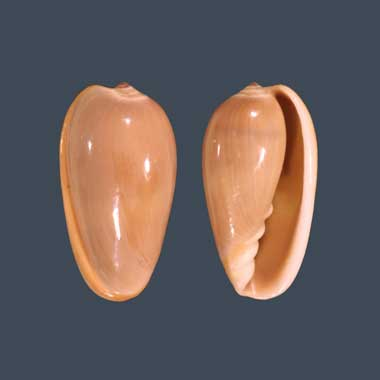
Prunum

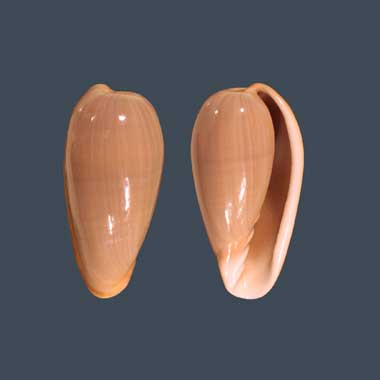
Bullata

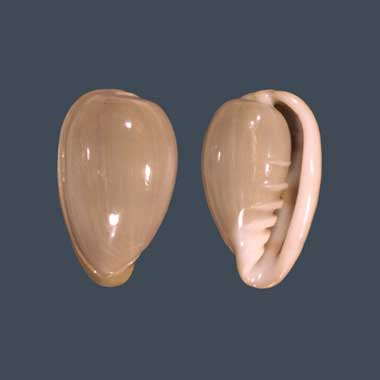
Cryptospira

== Species ==
Species within the genus Bullata include:

- Bullata analuciae de Souza & Coovert, 2001
- Bullata bullata (Born, 1778) - type species
- Bullata guerrinii de Souza & Coovert, 2001
- Bullata largillieri (Kiener, 1834)
- Bullata lilacina (Sowerby II, 1846)
- Bullata matthewsi (van Mol & Tursch, 1967)

Species brought into synonymy

- Bullata angustata (G.B. Sowerby, 1846): synonym of Volvarina angustata (G.B. Sowerby II, 1846)
- Bullata bernardi (Largilliert, 1845): synonym of Cryptospira strigata (Dillwyn, 1817)
- Bullata dactylus (Lamarck, 1822): synonym of Cryptospira dactylus (Lamarck, 1822)
- Bullata glauca (Jousseaume, 1875): synonym of Cryptospira glauca Jousseaume, 1875
- Bullata hindsiana (Petit de la Saussaye, 1851): synonym of Prunum olivaeforme (Kiener, 1834)
- Bullata lipei Clover, 1990: synonym of Prunum lipei (Clover, 1990)
- Bullata mabellae Melvill & Standen, 1901: synonym of Prunum mabellae (Melvill & Standen, 1901)
- Bullata princeps G. B. Sowerby III, 1901: synonym of Closia princeps (G.B. Sowerby III, 1901)
- Bullata quadrilineata (Gaskoin, 1849): synonym of Cryptospira quadrilineata (Gaskoin, 1849)
- Bullata sarda (Kiener, 1834): synonym of Closia sarda (Kiener, 1834)
- Bullata scripta (Hinds, 1844): synonym of Cryptospira scripta (Hinds, 1844)
- Bullata strigata (Dillwyn, 1817): synonym of Cryptospira strigata (Dillwyn, 1817)
- Bullata tricincta (Hinds, 1844): synonym of Cryptospira tricincta (Hinds, 1844)
- Bullata ventricosa (Fischer von Waldheim, 1807): synonym of Cryptospira ventricosa (Fischer von Waldheim, 1807)
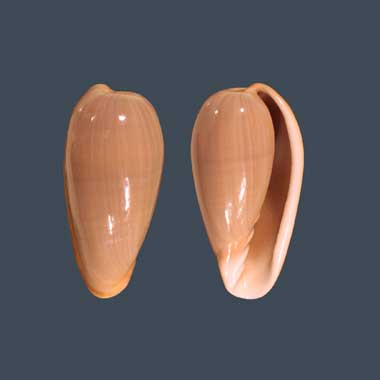
Bullata bullata

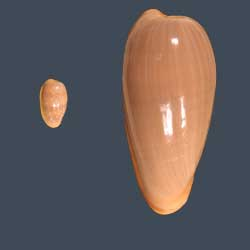
Bullata largillieri and Bullata bullata

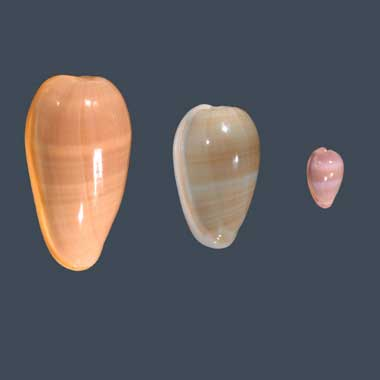
Bullata bullata, Bullata matthewsi and Bullata lilacina
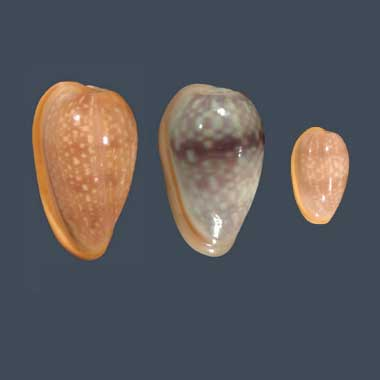
Bullata analucia, Bullata guerrini, Bullata largilleri

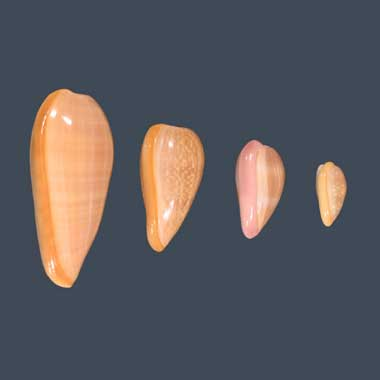

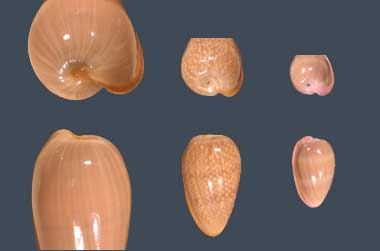
Spire and shape comparison
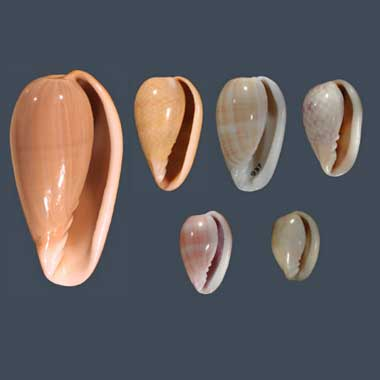

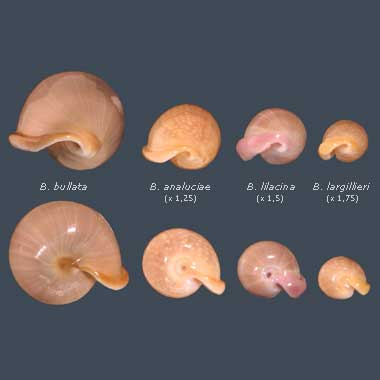
