= V. elegans =

V. elegans may refer to:

- Virginia elegans, a synonym for Virginia valeriae, a snake species found in the United States
- Voluta elegans, a synonym for Cryptospira elegans, a sea snail species
