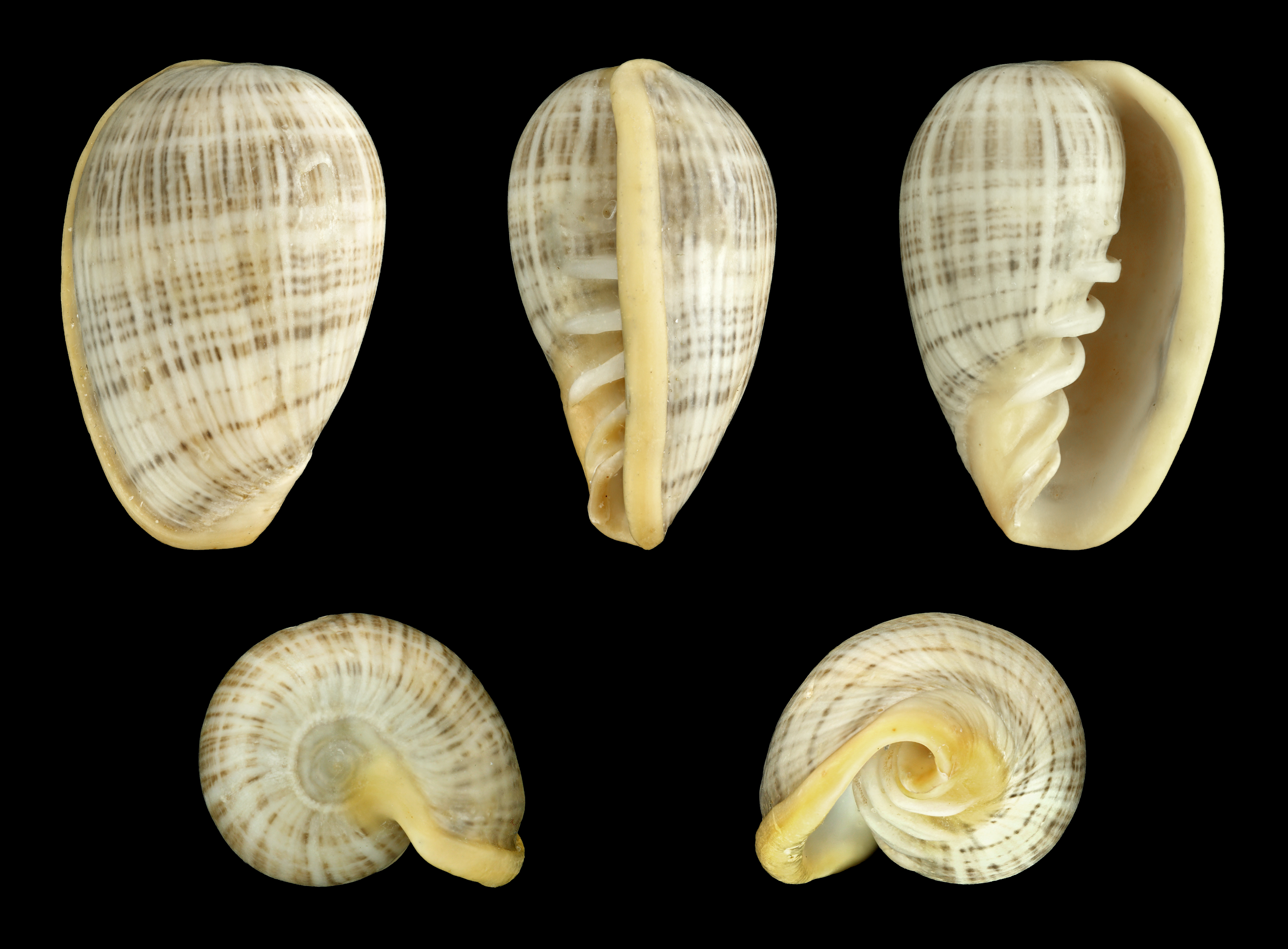
- Cryptospira elegans

Scientific classification
- Kingdom: Animalia
- Phylum: Mollusca
- Class: Gastropoda
- Subclass: Caenogastropoda
- Order: Neogastropoda
- Superfamily: Volutoidea
- Family: Marginellidae
- Genus: Cryptospira; Hinds, 1844

Type species
- Marginella tricincta Hinds, R.B., 1844

Synonyms
- Crystospira Cotton, 1949; Marginella (Cryptospira) Hinds, 1844

= Cryptospira =

Genus of gastropods

Cryptospira is a genus of sea snails, marine gastropod mollusks in the subfamily Pruninae of the family Marginellidae, the margin snails.

== Species ==
According to the World Register of Marine Species (WoRMS), the following species with valid names are included within the genus Cryptospira :

- Cryptospira bridgettae Wakefield, 2010
- Cryptospira cloveriana Wakefield, 2010
- Cryptospira dactylus (Lamarck, 1822)
- Cryptospira elegans (Gmelin, 1791)
- Cryptospira fischeri (Bavay, 1903)
- Cryptospira glauca Jousseaume, 1875
- Cryptospira grisea (Jousseaume, 1917)
- † Cryptospira hordeastra Darragh, 2017
- Cryptospira immersa (Reeve, 1865)
- Cryptospira marchii Jousseaume, 1875
- Cryptospira mccleeryi Wakefield, 2010
- Cryptospira merguiensis Bozzetti, 2015
- Cryptospira onychina (A. Adams & Reeve, 1850)
- Cryptospira praecallosa (Higgins, 1876)
- Cryptospira quadrilineata (Gaskoin, 1849)
- Cryptospira sabellii Cossignani, 2006
- Cryptospira scripta (Hinds, 1844)
- Cryptospira strigata (Dillwyn, 1817)
- Cryptospira trailli (Reeve, 1865)
- Cryptospira tricincta (Hinds, 1844)
- Cryptospira ventricosa (G. Fischer, 1807)
- Cryptospira wallacei Wakefield, 2010

Synonyms:

- Cryptospira angustata (G.B. Sowerby, 1846) is a synonym of Volvarina angustata (G.B. Sowerby, 1846)
- Cryptospira caducocincta (May, 1916) is a synonym of Mesoginella caducocincta (May, 1916)
- Cryptospira loebbeckeana (Weinkauff, 1878) is a synonym of Cryptospira praecallosa (Higgins, 1876)
- Cryptospira mabellae (Melvill & Standen, 1901) is a synonym of Prunum mabellae (Melvill & Standen, 1901)
- Cryptospira martini Petit, 1853 is a synonym of Prunum martini (Petit, 1853)
- Cryptospira olivella (Reeve, 1865) is a synonym of Mesoginella olivella (Reeve, 1865)
- Cryptospira quiquandoni Cossignani, 2006 is a synonym of Cryptospira immersa (Reeve, 1865)
- Cryptospira rubens (Martens, 1881) is a synonym of Prunum rubens (Martens, 1881)
- Cryptospira verreauxi Jousseaume, 1875 is a synonym of Volvarina verreauxi (Jousseaume, 1875)
