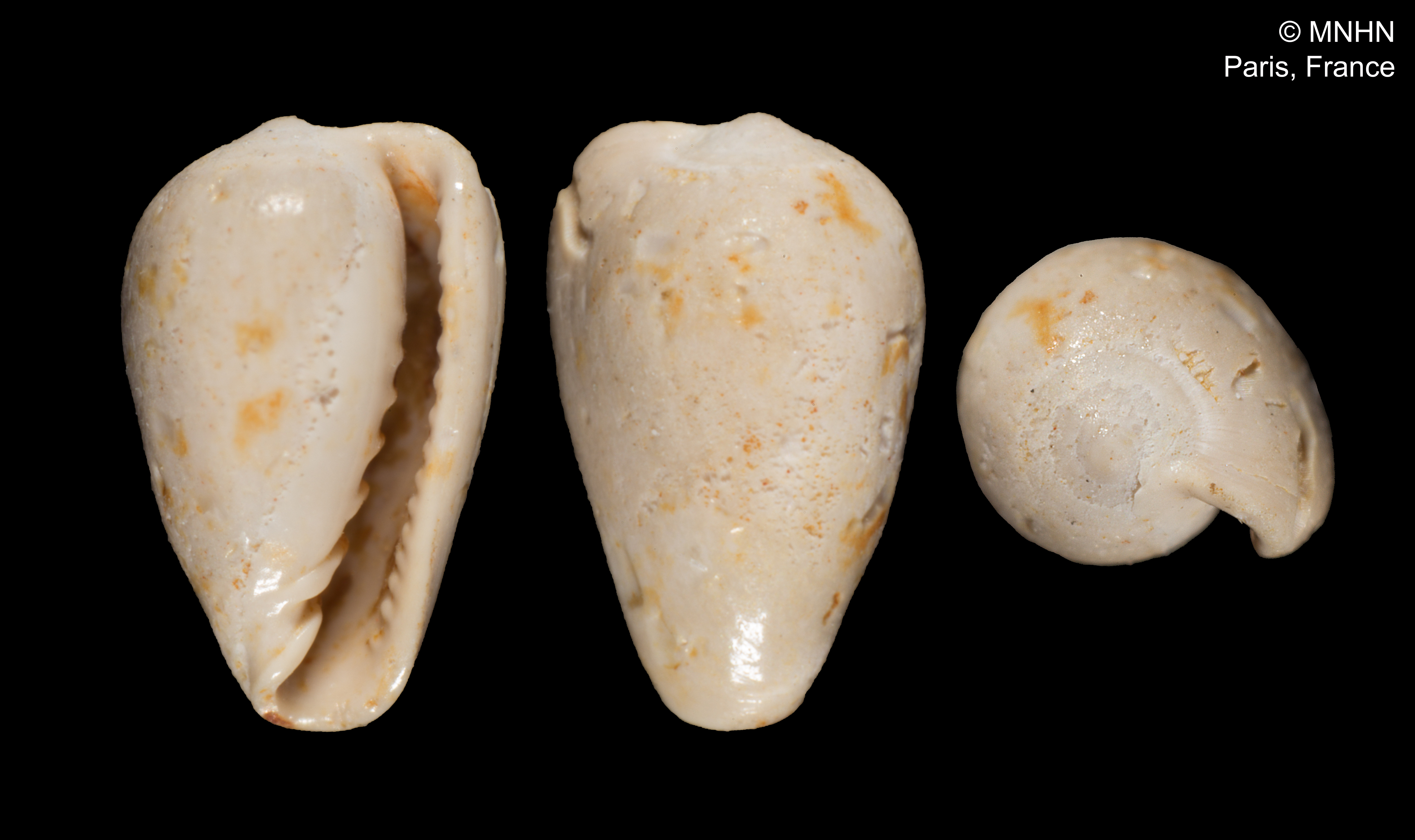
- Shell of Closia convergens (holotype at MNHN, Paris)

Scientific classification
- Kingdom: Animalia
- Phylum: Mollusca
- Class: Gastropoda
- Subclass: Caenogastropoda
- Order: Neogastropoda
- Superfamily: Volutoidea
- Family: Marginellidae
- Subfamily: Marginellinae
- Genus: Closia; Gray, 1857

Type species
- Marginella sarda Kiener, 1834

= Closia =

Genus of gastropods

Closia is a genus of sea snails, marine gastropod mollusks in the subfamily Pruninae of the family Marginellidae, the margin snails.

== Species ==
Species within the genus Closia include:

- † Closia cenchridium Le Renard & van Nieulande, 1985
- † Closia chevallieri Le Renard & van Nieulande, 1985
- † Closia convergens Le Renard & van Nieulande, 1985
- Closia giadae Cossignani, 2001
- † Closia inadspecta Le Renard & van Nieulande, 1985
- Closia limpida Bozzetti, 1992
- Closia majuscula (Martens, 1877)
- Closia princeps (G.B. Sowerby III, 1901)
- † Closia pseudampulla Le Renard & van Nieulande, 1985
- Closia sarda (Kiener, 1834)

Species brought into synonymy

- † Closia aucklandica Dell, 1950 : synonym of † Archierato aucklandica (Dell, 1950) (original combination)
- Closia lilacina (G.B. Sowerby II, 1846): synonym of Bullata lilacina (G.B. Sowerby II, 1846)
- Closia manceli Jousseaume, 1875: synonym of Cystiscus manceli (Jousseaume, 1875)
- Closia maoria Powell, 1937: synonym of Ovaginella maoria (Powell, 1937)
