= Closia giadae =

Scientific classification
- Kingdom: Animalia
- Phylum: Mollusca
- Class: Gastropoda
- Subclass: Caenogastropoda
- Order: Neogastropoda
- Family: Marginellidae
- Genus: Closia
- Species: C. giadae

Binomial name
- Closia giadae Cossignani, 2001

Species of gastropod

Closia giadae is a species of sea snail, a marine gastropod mollusk in the family Marginellidae, the margin snails.
