= Bullata analuciae =

Scientific classification
- Kingdom: Animalia
- Phylum: Mollusca
- Class: Gastropoda
- Subclass: Caenogastropoda
- Order: Neogastropoda
- Family: Marginellidae
- Genus: Bullata
- Species: B. analuciae

Binomial name
- Bullata analuciae de Souza & Coovert, 2001

Species of gastropod

Bullata analuciae is a species of sea snail, a marine gastropod mollusk in the family Marginellidae, the margin snails.
