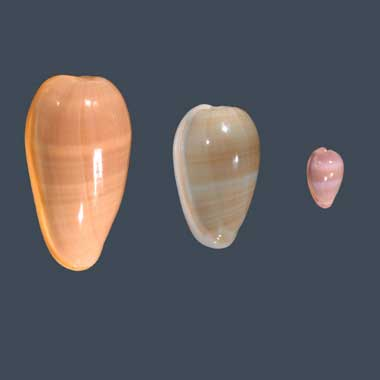
- Banded species of genus Bullata

Scientific classification
- Kingdom: Animalia
- Phylum: Mollusca
- Class: Gastropoda
- Subclass: Caenogastropoda
- Order: Neogastropoda
- Family: Marginellidae
- Genus: Bullata
- Species: B. matthewsi

Binomial name
- Bullata matthewsi (Van Mol & Tursch, 1967)

Synonyms
- Marginella matthewsi Van Mol & Tursch, 1967

= Bullata matthewsi =

Species of gastropod

Bullata matthewsi, common name : Matthew's marginella, is a species of sea snail, a marine gastropod mollusk in the family Marginellidae, the margin snails.

== Description ==
The shell size varies from 40 to 53 millimetres (1.6 to 2.1 in).

== Distribution ==
This species is distributed in the Atlantic Ocean along Northern Brazil.
