= Cryptospira immersa =

Scientific classification
- Kingdom: Animalia
- Phylum: Mollusca
- Class: Gastropoda
- Subclass: Caenogastropoda
- Order: Neogastropoda
- Family: Marginellidae
- Genus: Cryptospira
- Species: C. immersa

Binomial name
- Cryptospira immersa (Reeve L.A., 1865)

Synonyms
- Cryptospira quiquandoni Cossignani, 2006; Marginella immersa Reeve, 1865 (basionym)

Species of gastropod

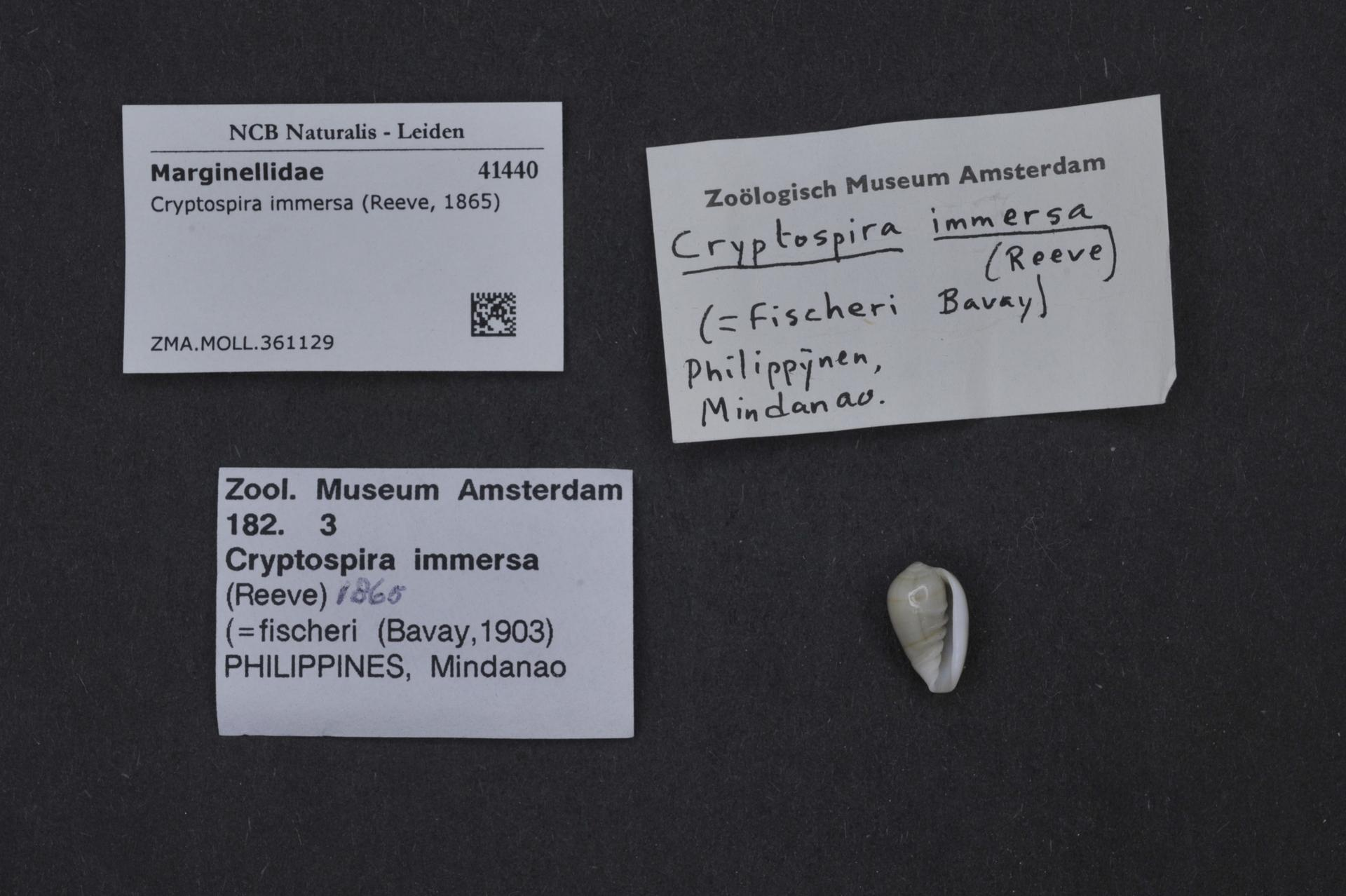
Cryptospira immersa (Reeve, 1865).

Cryptospira immersa is a species of sea snail, a marine gastropod mollusk in the family Marginellidae, the margin snails.

== Description ==
The shell size varies between 14 mm and 25 mm.

== Distribution ==
This species is distributed in the Bay of Bengal and in the Pacific Ocean along New Caledonia.
