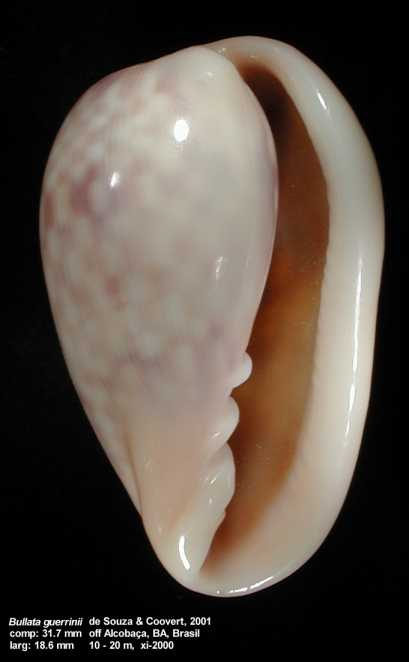

Scientific classification
- Kingdom: Animalia
- Phylum: Mollusca
- Class: Gastropoda
- Subclass: Caenogastropoda
- Order: Neogastropoda
- Family: Marginellidae
- Genus: Bullata
- Species: B. guerrinii

Binomial name
- Bullata guerrinii de Souza & Coovert, 2001

= Bullata guerrinii =

Species of gastropod

Bullata guerrinii is a species of sea snail, a marine gastropod mollusk in the family Marginellidae, the margin snails.

== Description ==
The size of the shell varies between 20 mm and 37 mm. The shell shows distinct cream spots against a caramel or dark brown background. There are faint upward spiraling bands on the shell. The lip has a moderate thickness. The long aperture is about as broad as the thickness of the lip.

== Distribution ==
This species occurs in the Atlantic Ocean off Eastern Brazil.
