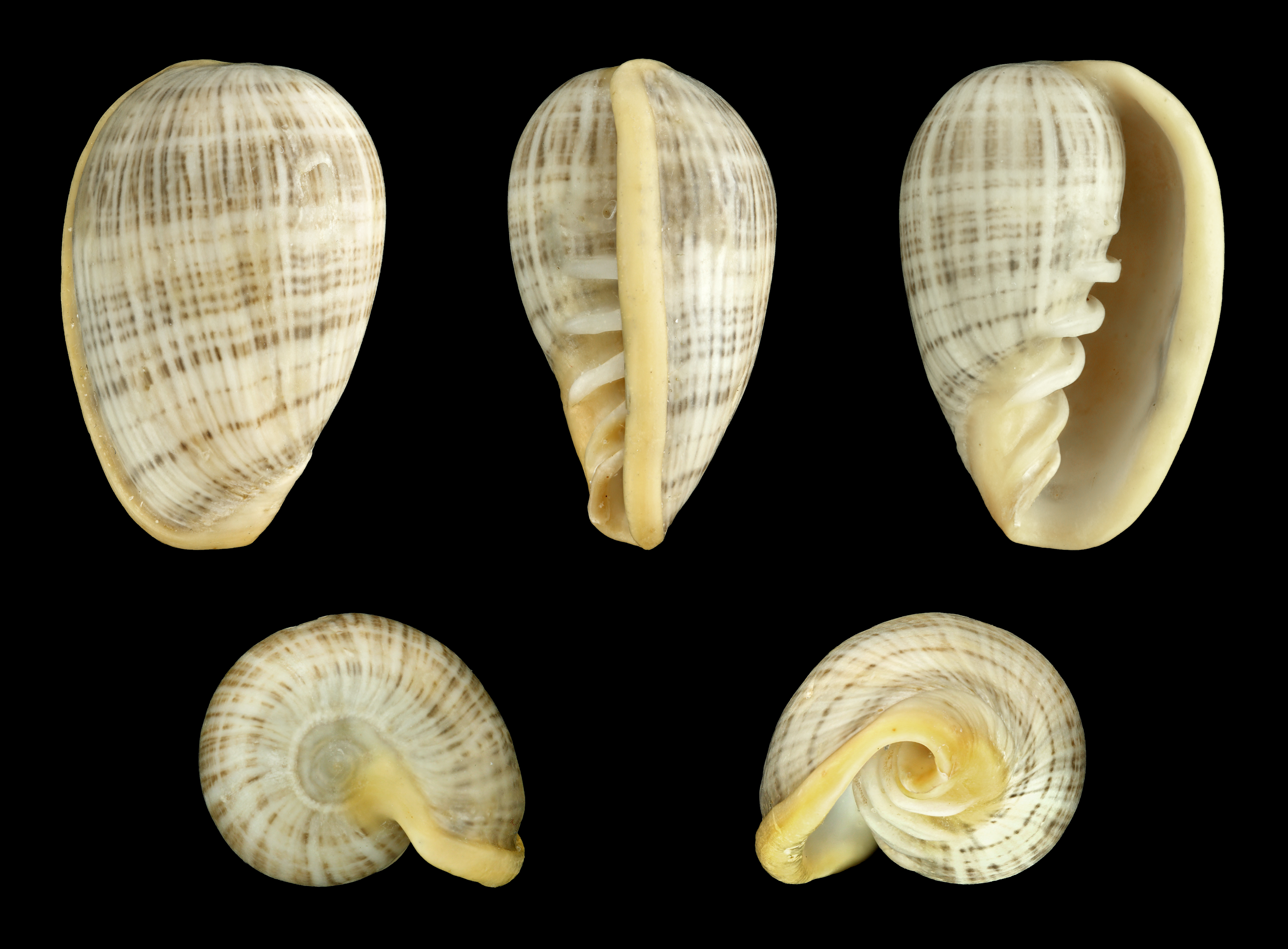

Scientific classification
- Domain: Eukaryota
- Kingdom: Animalia
- Phylum: Mollusca
- Class: Gastropoda
- Subclass: Caenogastropoda
- Order: Neogastropoda
- Family: Marginellidae
- Genus: Cryptospira
- Species: C. elegans

Binomial name
- Cryptospira elegans (Gmelin, 1791)

Synonyms
- Marginella elegans (Gmelin, 1791); Voluta elegans Gmelin, 1791 (original combination)

= Cryptospira elegans =

Elegant marginella

Species of gastropod

Cryptospira elegans, the elegant marginella, is a sea snail species in the genus Cryptospira. It is found in Asia.
