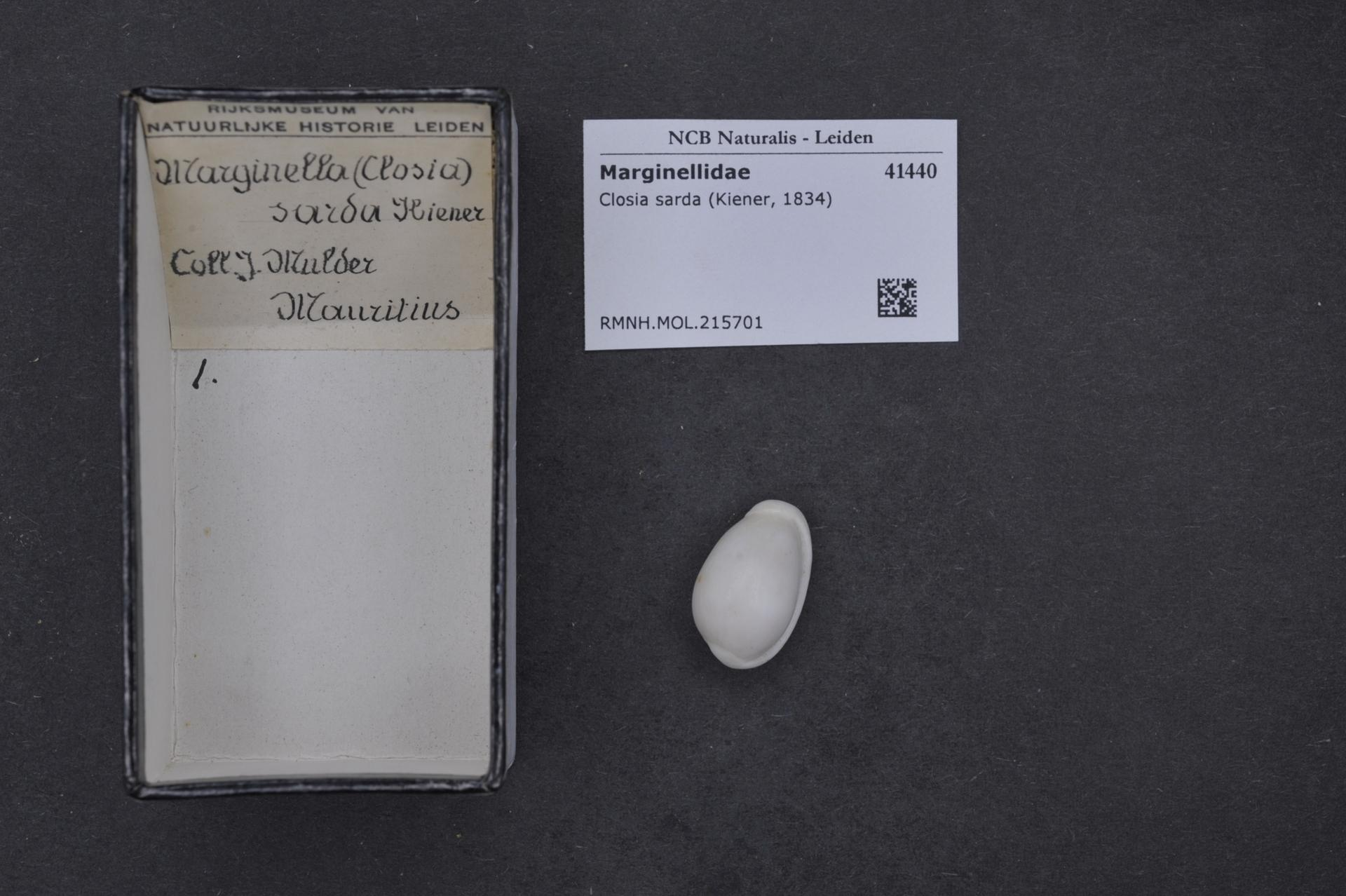
- Closia sarda

Scientific classification
- Kingdom: Animalia
- Phylum: Mollusca
- Class: Gastropoda
- Subclass: Caenogastropoda
- Order: Neogastropoda
- Family: Marginellidae
- Genus: Closia
- Species: C. sarda

Binomial name
- Closia sarda (Kiener, 1834)

Synonyms
- Bullata sarda (Kiener, 1834); Marginella sarda Kiener, 1834

= Closia sarda =

Species of gastropod

Closia sarda is a species of sea snail, a marine gastropod mollusk in the family Marginellidae, the margin snails.

== Distribution ==
This species occurs in the Mascarene Basin.
