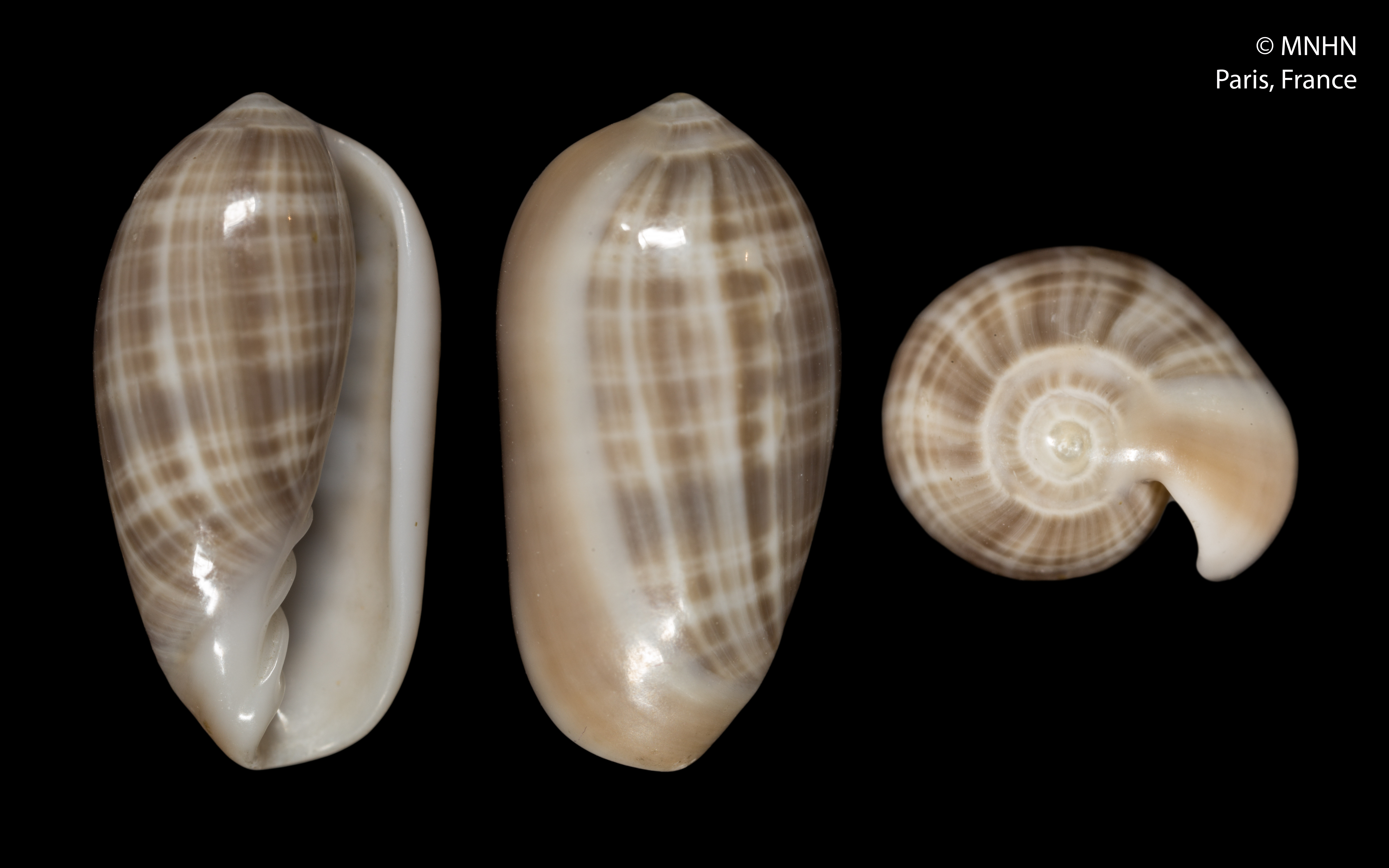
- Shell of Volvarina verreauxi (lectotype at MNHN, Paris)

Scientific classification
- Kingdom: Animalia
- Phylum: Mollusca
- Class: Gastropoda
- Subclass: Caenogastropoda
- Order: Neogastropoda
- Family: Marginellidae
- Subfamily: Marginellinae
- Genus: Volvarina
- Species: V. verreauxi

Binomial name
- Volvarina verreauxi Jousseaume, 1875

Synonyms
- Bullata verreauxi Jousseaume, 1875 (original combination); Cryptospira verreauxi (Jousseaume, 1875)

= Volvarina verreauxi =

Species of gastropod

Volvarina verreauxi is a species of sea snail, a marine gastropod mollusk in the family Marginellidae, the margin snails.

== Description ==
The length of the shell attains 12.3 mm, its diameter 6 mm.

The solid shell has an oval shape. It is smooth and shiny. Its exterior has a grid pattern, made up of a series of bluish-grey transverse zones, unequal in width and intensity. They are separated by whitish bands and interrupted by longitudinal lines of the same color. The spire is very short and is composed of four whorls, separated by a linear suture bordered by a small whitish edging. The first is of a vitreous yellowish white. It forms at the end a small smooth and shiny apex.

The aperture, narrow, elongated and slightly constricted in the middle, widens a little in front. Its color is white, with 4 to 5 zones of very light gray. It ends behind in a shallow and widening canal. Its external edge, smooth inside and inflected in the middle on the side of the aperture, is covered outside with a large callus, a longitudinal furrow which divides it into two parts. Posteriorly, the callus advances tapering to the end of the whorl, and anteriorly, it merges into the columellar callus, after having covered the anterior end of the shell. The inner lip contains in its anterior third 4 rather prominent and oblique plicae, of which the two anterior ones meet outside and come, by describing a rounded curve, to join the external edge with which they unite without solution of continuity.

== Distribution ==
This marine species occurs off Sri Lanka.
