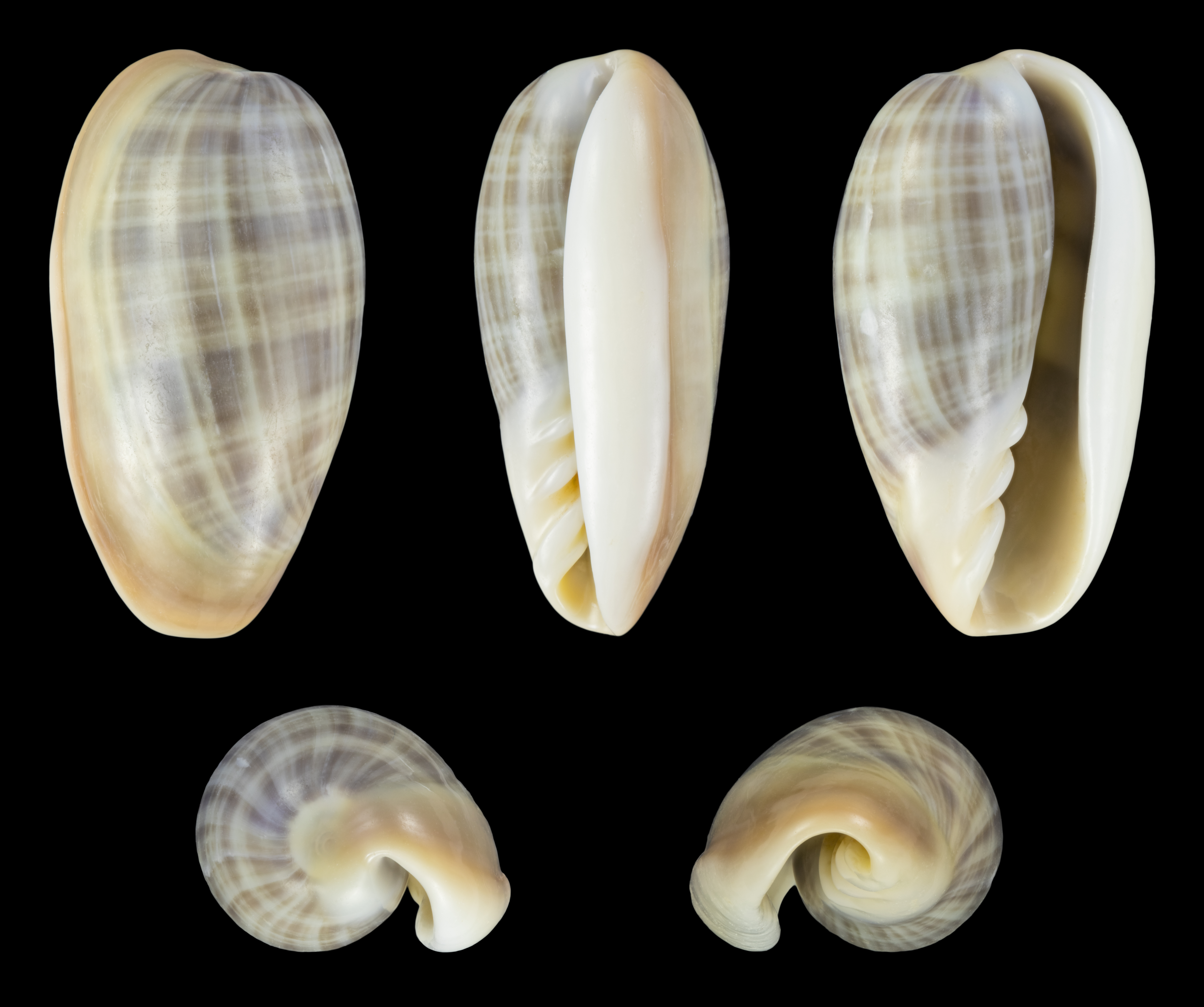

Scientific classification
- Kingdom: Animalia
- Phylum: Mollusca
- Class: Gastropoda
- Subclass: Caenogastropoda
- Order: Neogastropoda
- Family: Marginellidae
- Genus: Volvarina
- Species: V. angustata

Binomial name
- Volvarina angustata (Sowerby II, 1846)

Synonyms
- Bullata angustata (G.B. Sowerby, 1846); Cryptospira angustata (G.B. Sowerby, 1846); Marginella angustata Sowerby, 1846 (basionym)

= Volvarina angustata =

Species of gastropod

Volvarina angustata, common name : the narrow marginella, is a species of sea snail, a marine gastropod mollusk in the family Marginellidae, the margin snails.

== Description ==
The shell size varies between 11 mm and 28 mm. Its cylindrically ovate, spire flat and calloused.

== Distribution ==
This species is distributed in the Indian Ocean along the Mascarene basin, Réunion, and in the Gulf of Bengal along the Andaman Islands, Sri Lanka, and Southern India.
